= October 1 =

October 1 this year in various calendars
- Thursday, 1 October 2026
Akan	Monoyaw
Armenian	13 Sahmi 1476
Aztec	Nēmontēmi 4, 5 Malīnalli
Babylonian	18 Ululu, 2337 SE
Balinese pawukon	Luang, Pepet, Kajeng, Laba, Umanis, Maulu, Wraspati of Ugu, Indra, Erangan, Duka
Bengali	16 Ashshin, BS 1433
Chinese	Yang Earth Monkey・Legs Mansion; Fire Horse Year, Month 8, Day 21 (Qiufen, 7 days until Hanlu)
Common Era	1 October 2026 CE
Coptic	21 Thout, AM 1743
Egyptian	18 Mechir, 2775 NE
Ethiopian	21 Maskaram, 2019 Amätä Məhrät
French Republican	Décade I, Nonidi de Vendémiaire de l'Année 235 de la République
Gregorian	1 October, AD 2026
Hebrew	20 Tishrei, AM 5787
Hindu	Kṛttikā・Vajra; Solar: 15 Āśvina, 1948 SE; Lunisolar: Pañcamī, Kṛishna pakṣa of Bhādrapada, 2083 VE; Rāudra・5127 KY・1,872,849
Icelandic	Fimmtudagur, 8 Haustmánuður 2026
Islamic	18 Rabi' al-thani, AH 1448 (using tabular method)
ISO week date	2026-W40-4
Japanese	21 Hazuki, Reiwa 8 (Shūbun, 7 days until Kanro)
Julian	18 September, AD 2026 (AM 7534)
Julian day	2461315
Korean	21 Dakdal, 4359 DE
Maya	13.0.13.17.12; 5 Yax, 5 Eb
Roman	ante diem XIV Kalendas Octobres, MMDCCLXXIX AUC
Solar Hijri	9 Mehr, SH 1405
Tibetan	20 khrums, me pho rta 2153 or 1772 or 1000

<<	October					>>
Su	Mo	Tu	We	Th	Fr	Sa
				1	2	3
4	5	6	7	8	9	10
11	12	13	14	15	16	17
18	19	20	21	22	23	24
25	26	27	28	29	30	31
2026

October 1 in recent years
2026 (Thursday)
2025 (Wednesday)
2024 (Tuesday)
2023 (Sunday)
2022 (Saturday)
2021 (Friday)
2020 (Thursday)
2019 (Tuesday)
2018 (Monday)
2017 (Sunday)

October 1 is the 274th day of the year (275th in leap years) in the Gregorian calendar; 91 days remain until the end of the year.

== Events ==
=== Pre-1600 ===
- 331 BC – Alexander the Great defeats Darius III of Persia in the Battle of Gaugamela.
- 366 – Pope Damasus I is consecrated.
- 959 – Edgar the Peaceful becomes king of all England, in succession to Eadwig.
- 965 – Pope John XIII is consecrated.
- 1553 – The coronation of Queen Mary I of England is held at Westminster Abbey.
- 1588 – The coronation of Shah Abbas I of Persia occurs.

=== 1601–1900 ===
- 1730 – Ahmed III is forced to abdicate as the Ottoman sultan.
- 1779 – The city of Tampere, Finland (belonging to Sweden at this time) is founded by King Gustav III of Sweden.
- 1787 – Russians under Alexander Suvorov defeat the Turks at Kinburn.
- 1791 – First session of the French Legislative Assembly.
- 1795 – More than a year after the Battle of Sprimont, the Austrian Netherlands (present-day Belgium) are officially annexed by Revolutionary France.
- 1800 – Via the Third Treaty of San Ildefonso, Spain cedes Louisiana to France, which would sell the land to the United States thirty months later.
- 1814 – The Congress of Vienna opens with the intention of redrawing Europe's political map after the defeat of Napoleon in the previous spring.
- 1827 – Russo-Persian War: The Russian army under Ivan Paskevich captures Yerevan.
- 1829 – The South African College is founded in Cape Town, later separating into the University of Cape Town and the South African College Schools.
- 1832 – Texian political delegates convene at San Felipe de Austin to petition for changes in the governance of Mexican Texas.
- 1861 – Mrs Beeton's Book of Household Management is published, going on to sell 60,000 copies in its first year and remaining in print until the present day.
- 1887 – Balochistan is conquered by the British Empire.
- 1890 – Yosemite National Park is established by the U.S. Congress.
- 1891 – Stanford University opens its doors in California, United States.
- 1898 – The Vienna University of Economics and Business Administration is founded under the name k.u.k. Exportakademie.

=== 1901–present ===
- 1903 – Baseball: The Boston Americans play the Pittsburgh Pirates in the first game of the modern World Series.
- 1908 – Ford Model T automobiles are offered for sale at a price of US$825.
- 1910 – A large bomb destroys the Los Angeles Times building, killing 21.
- 1915 – The Metamorphosis written by Franz Kafka is published in the German journal Die Weißen Blätter
- 1918 – World War I: The Egyptian Expeditionary Force captures Damascus.
- 1918 – Sayid Abdullah becomes the last Khan of Khiva.
- 1923 – The 1923 Imperial Conference opened in London.
- 1923 – Georges Carpentier knocked out former British heavyweight champion Joe Beckett a mere twenty seconds into the first round of their boxing match at Olympia in London.
- 1928 – The Soviet Union introduces its first five-year plan.
- 1928 – Newark Liberty International Airport opens, becoming the first airport in the New York City metro area.
- 1931 – The George Washington Bridge in the United States is opened, linking New Jersey and New York.
- 1931 – Clara Campoamor persuades the Constituent Cortes to enfranchise women in Spain's new constitution.
- 1936 – Spanish Civil War: Francisco Franco is named head of the Nationalist government of Spain.
- 1936 – Spanish Civil War: The Central Committee of Antifascist Militias of Catalonia dissolves itself, handing control of Catalan defence militias over to the Generalitat.
- 1938 – Pursuant to the Munich Agreement signed the day before, Nazi Germany begins the military occupation and annexation of Czechoslovakia's Sudetenland.
- 1939 – World War II: After a one-month siege, German troops occupy Warsaw.
- 1940 – The Pennsylvania Turnpike, often considered the first superhighway in the United States, opens to traffic.
- 1942 – World War II: USS Grouper torpedoes Lisbon Maru, not knowing that she is carrying British prisoners of war from Hong Kong.
- 1943 – World War II: After the Four Days of Naples, Allied troops enter the city.
- 1946 – Nazi leaders are sentenced at the Nuremberg trials.
- 1946 – The Daegu October incident occurs in Allied-occupied Korea.
- 1947 – The North American F-86 Sabre flies for the first time.
- 1949 – The People's Republic of China is established.
- 1953 – Andhra State is formed, consisting of a Telugu-speaking area carved out of India's Madras State.
- 1953 – A United States-South Korea mutual defense treaty is concluded in Washington, D.C.
- 1955 – The Xinjiang Uyghur Autonomous Region is established.
- 1957 – The motto In God We Trust first appears on U.S. paper currency.
- 1958 – The National Advisory Committee for Aeronautics is replaced by NASA.
- 1960 – Nigeria gains independence from the United Kingdom.
- 1961 – The United States Defense Intelligence Agency is formed, becoming the country's first centralized military intelligence organization.
- 1961 – East and West Cameroon merge to form the Federal Republic of Cameroon.
- 1961 – The CTV Television Network, Canada's first private television network, is launched.
- 1962 – James Meredith becomes the first African American student to enroll at the University of Mississippi.
- 1963 – On its third anniversary as an independent nation, Nigeria became a republic.
- 1964 – The Free Speech Movement is launched on the campus of the University of California, Berkeley.
- 1964 – Japanese Shinkansen ("bullet trains") begin high-speed rail service from Tokyo to Osaka.
- 1965 – At dawn, seven Indonesian Army officers and a police inspector were assassinated by the September 30 Movement at Lubang Buaya, East Jakarta. In addition, two more officers were killed in Yogyakarta. The Army pinned the murders to the Communist Party of Indonesia, resulting in mass killings of suspected leftists.
- 1966 – West Coast Airlines Flight 956 crashes with no survivors in Oregon. This accident marks the first loss of a DC-9.
- 1968 – Guyana nationalizes the British Guiana Broadcasting Service, which would eventually become part of the National Communications Network, Guyana.
- 1969 – Concorde breaks the sound barrier for the first time.
- 1971 – Walt Disney World opens near Orlando, Florida.
- 1971 – The first practical CT scanner is used to diagnose a patient.
- 1975 – Muhammad Ali defeats Joe Frazier in a boxing match in Manila, Philippines.
- 1978 – Tuvalu gains independence from the United Kingdom.
- 1979 – Pope John Paul II begins his first pastoral visit to the United States.
- 1979 – The MTR, Hong Kong's rapid transit railway system, opens.
- 1982 – Helmut Kohl replaces Helmut Schmidt as Chancellor of Germany through a constructive vote of no confidence.
- 1982 – EPCOT Center (Experimental Prototype Community of Tomorrow) opens at Walt Disney World in Florida.
- 1982 – Sony and Phillips launch the compact disc in Japan; on the same day, Sony releases the model CDP-101 compact disc player, the first player of its kind.
- 1985 – Israel-Palestinian conflict: Israel attacks the Palestine Liberation Organization's Tunisia headquarters during Operation Wooden Leg.
- 1987 – The 5.9 M_{w} Whittier Narrows earthquake shakes the San Gabriel Valley with a Mercalli intensity of VIII (Severe), killing eight and injuring 200.
- 1989 – Denmark introduces the world's first legal same-sex registered partnerships.
- 1991 – Croatian War of Independence: The Siege of Dubrovnik begins.
- 1994 – Palau enters a Compact of Free Association with the United States.
- 2000 – Israeli–Palestinian conflict: Palestinians protest the killing of 12-year-old Muhammad al-Durrah by Israeli police in northern Israel, beginning the "October 2000 events".
- 2001 – Militants attack the state legislature building in Kashmir, killing 38.
- 2001 – 3G wireless technology first becomes available when it is adopted by Japanese telecommunications company NTT Docomo.
- 2003 – The popular and controversial English-language imageboard 4chan is launched.
- 2009 – The Supreme Court of the United Kingdom takes over the judicial functions of the House of Lords.
- 2012 – A ferry collision off the coast of Hong Kong kills 38 people and injures 102 others.
- 2014 – A series of explosions at a gunpowder plant in Bulgaria completely destroys the factory, killing 15 people.
- 2014 – A double bombing of an elementary school in Homs, Syria kills over 50 people.
- 2015 – A gunman kills nine people at a community college in Oregon.
- 2015 – Heavy rains trigger a major landslide in Guatemala, killing 280 people.
- 2015 – The American cargo vessel SS El Faro sinks with all of its 33 crew after steaming into the eyewall of Hurricane Joaquin.
- 2016 – The leader of the Spanish Socialist Workers' Party, Pedro Sánchez, resigns. He would return to the position a year later.
- 2017 – An independence referendum, later declared illegal by the Constitutional Court of Spain, takes place in Catalonia.
- 2017 – Sixty people are killed and 867 others injured in a mass shooting at a country music festival at the Las Vegas Strip in the United States; the gunman, Stephen Paddock, later commits suicide.
- 2018 – The International Court of Justice rules that Chile is not obliged to negotiate access to the Pacific Ocean with Bolivia.
- 2019 – Kuopio school stabbing: One dies and ten are injured when Joel Marin, armed with a sabre, attacks a school class at Savo Vocational College in Kuopio, Finland.
- 2021 – The 2020 World Expo in Dubai begins. Its opening was originally scheduled for 20 October 2020 but was delayed due to the COVID-19 pandemic.
- 2022 – One hundred and thirty-five are killed in a human crush following a football match at Kanjuruhan Stadium in East Java, Indonesia.
- 2024 – Israel invaded Southern Lebanon, marking the fifth Israeli invasion of Lebanon since 1978.

== Births ==
=== Pre-1600 ===
- 86 BC – Sallust, Roman historian (died 34 BC)
- 208 – Alexander Severus, Roman emperor (died 235)
- 1207 – Henry III of England (died 1272)
- 1476 – Guy XVI, Count of Laval (died 1531)
- 1480 – Saint Cajetan, Italian Catholic priest and religious reformer (died 1547)
- 1507 – Giacomo Barozzi da Vignola, Italian architect who designed the Church of the Gesù (died 1573)
- 1526 – Dorothy Stafford, English noble (died 1604)
- 1540 – Johann Jakob Grynaeus, Swiss pastor and theologian (died 1617)
- 1541 – El Greco, Greek painter, sculptor, and architect of the Spanish Renaissance (died 1614)
- 1542 – Álvaro de Mendaña de Neira, Spanish explorer (died 1595)
- 1550 – Anne of Saint Bartholomew, Spanish Discalced Carmelite nun (died 1626)
- 1554 – Leonardus Lessius, Jesuit theologian (died 1623)

=== 1601–1900 ===
- 1620 – Nicolaes Pieterszoon Berchem, Dutch painter (died 1683)
- 1671 – Luigi Guido Grandi, Italian monk, mathematician, and engineer (died 1742)
- 1681 – Giulia Lama, Italian painter (died 1747)
- 1685 – Charles VI, Holy Roman Emperor (died 1740)
- 1691 – Arthur Onslow, English lawyer and politician, Speaker of the House of Commons (died 1768)
- 1712 – William Shippen, American physician and politician (died 1801)
- 1719 – John Bligh, 3rd Earl of Darnley, British parliamentarian (died 1781)
- 1724 – Giovanni Battista Cirri, Italian cellist and composer (died 1808)
- 1729 – Anton Cajetan Adlgasser, German organist and composer (died 1777)
- 1730 – Richard Stockton, American lawyer, jurist, and politician (died 1781)
- 1760 – William Thomas Beckford, English author and politician (died 1844)
- 1762 – Anton Bernolák, Slovak priest and linguist (died 1813)
- 1771 – Pierre Baillot, French violinist and composer (died 1842)
- 1791 – Sergey Aksakov, Russian soldier and author (died 1859)
- 1808 – Mary Anna Custis Lee, American wife of Robert E. Lee (died 1873)
- 1832 – Caroline Harrison, American educator, 24th First Lady of the United States (died 1892)
- 1832 – Henry Clay Work, American composer and songwriter (died 1884)
- 1835 – Ádám Politzer, Hungarian-Austrian physician and anatomist (died 1920)
- 1842 – S. Subramania Iyer, Indian lawyer and jurist (died 1924)
- 1842 – Charles Cros, French poet and author (died 1888)
- 1846 – Nectarios of Aegina, Greek metropolitan and saint (died 1920)
- 1847 – Annie Besant, English-Indian activist and author (died 1933)
- 1857 – John Mackenzie Moore, Canadian architect (died 1930)
- 1865 – Paul Dukas, French composer, scholar, and critic (died 1935)
- 1878 – Othmar Spann, Austrian economist, sociologist, and philosopher (died 1950)
- 1881 – William Boeing, American engineer and businessman who founded the Boeing Company (died 1956)
- 1885 – Louis Untermeyer, American poet, anthologist, and critic (died 1977)
- 1887 – Ned Hanlon, Australian politician, 26th Premier of Queensland (died 1952)
- 1887 – Shizuichi Tanaka, Japanese general (died 1945)
- 1890 – Stanley Holloway, English actor (died 1982)
- 1893 – Faith Baldwin, American author (died 1978)
- 1893 – Cliff Friend, American pianist and songwriter (died 1974)
- 1893 – Ip Man, Chinese martial artist (died 1972)
- 1894 – Edgar Krahn, Estonian mathematician and academic (died 1961)
- 1895 – Liaquat Ali Khan, Indian-Pakistani lawyer and politician, 1st Prime Minister of Pakistan (died 1951)
- 1896 – Ted Healy, American actor, singer, and screenwriter (died 1937)
- 1899 – Ernest Haycox, American author (died 1950)
- 1900 – Tom Goddard, English cricketer (died 1966)
- 1900 – Ashfaqulla Khan, Indian activist (died 1927)

=== 1901–present ===
- 1903 – Vladimir Horowitz, Russian-born American pianist and composer (died 1989)
- 1903 – Pierre Veyron, French race car driver (died 1970)
- 1904 – Otto Robert Frisch, Austrian-English physicist and academic (died 1979)
- 1904 – A. K. Gopalan, Indian educator and politician (died 1977)
- 1906 – S. D. Burman, Indian composer and singer (died 1975)
- 1907 – Maurice Bardèche, French journalist, author, and critic (died 1998)
- 1907 – Ödön Pártos, Hungarian-Israeli viola player and composer (died 1977)
- 1908 – Herman David Koppel, Danish pianist and composer (died 1998)
- 1909 – Sam Yorty, American captain, politician, and 37th Mayor of Los Angeles (died 1998)
- 1910 – Fritz Köberle, Austrian-Brazilian physician and pathologist (died 1983)
- 1910 – José Enrique Moyal, Australian physicist and engineer (died 1998)
- 1910 – Bonnie Parker, American criminal (died 1934)
- 1910 – Chaim Pinchas Scheinberg, Polish-Israeli rabbi and scholar (died 2012)
- 1911 – Irwin Kostal, American songwriter, screenwriter, and publisher (died 1994)
- 1911 – Heinrich Mark, Estonian lawyer and politician, 5th Prime Minister of Estonia in exile (died 2004)
- 1912 – Kathleen Ollerenshaw, English mathematician, astronomer, and politician, Lord Mayor of Manchester (died 2014)
- 1913 – Hélio Gracie, Brazilian martial artist (died 2009)
- 1913 – Harry Lookofsky, American violinist and producer (died 1998)
- 1914 – Daniel J. Boorstin, American historian, lawyer, author, and 12th Librarian of Congress (died 2004)
- 1915 – Jerome Bruner, American psychologist and author (died 2016)
- 1917 – Cahal Daly, Irish cardinal and theologian (died 2009)
- 1919 – Bob Boyd, American baseball player (died 2004)
- 1919 – Roy John Britten, American molecular biologist (died 2012)
- 1919 – Majrooh Sultanpuri, Indian poet and songwriter (died 2000)
- 1920 – David Herbert Donald, American historian and author (died 2009)
- 1920 – Walter Matthau, American actor (died 2000)
- 1921 – James Whitmore, American actor (died 2009)
- 1922 – Chen-Ning Yang, Chinese-American physicist, academic, and Nobel Prize laureate (died 2025)
- 1924 – Jimmy Carter, American naval lieutenant, politician, 39th President of the United States, and Nobel Prize laureate (died 2024)
- 1924 – Bob Geigel, American wrestler and promoter (died 2014)
- 1924 – Leonie Kramer, Australian academic (died 2016)
- 1924 – William Rehnquist, American lawyer and jurist, 16th Chief Justice of the United States (died 2005)
- 1924 – Roger Williams, American pianist (died 2011)
- 1927 – Tom Bosley, American actor (died 2010)
- 1927 – Sherman Glenn Finesilver, American lawyer and judge (died 2006)
- 1927 – Sandy Gall, Malaysian-Scottish journalist and author (died 2025)
- 1928 – Laurence Harvey, Lithuanian-English actor, director, and producer (died 1973)
- 1928 – Willy Mairesse, Belgian race car driver (died 1969)
- 1928 – George Peppard, American actor (died 1994)
- 1928 – Sivaji Ganesan, Indian actor (died 2001)
- 1929 – Ken Arthurson, Australian rugby player and coach
- 1929 – Grady Chapman, American singer (died 2011)
- 1929 – Bonnie Owens, American singer-songwriter (died 2006)
- 1930 – Frank Gardner, Australian race car driver and manager (died 2009)
- 1930 – Richard Harris, Irish actor (died 2002)
- 1930 – Naimatullah Khan, Pakistani lawyer and politician, Mayor of Karachi (died 2020)
- 1930 – Philippe Noiret, French actor (died 2006)
- 1931 – Sylvano Bussotti, Italian violinist and composer (died 2021)
- 1931 – Anwar Shamim, Pakistani general (died 2013)
- 1931 – Alan Wagner, American radio host and critic (died 2007)
- 1932 – Albert Collins, American singer-songwriter and guitarist (died 1993)
- 1934 – Emilio Botín, Spanish banker and businessman (died 2014)
- 1935 – Julie Andrews, English actress and singer
- 1935 – Walter De Maria, American sculptor and drummer (died 2013)
- 1936 – Duncan Edwards, English footballer (died 1958)
- 1937 – Saeed Ahmed, Pakistani cricketer (died 2024)
- 1938 – Tunç Başaran, Turkish actor, director, producer, and screenwriter (died 2019)
- 1938 – Mary McFadden, American fashion designer (died 2024)
- 1938 – Stella Stevens, American actress and director (died 2023)
- 1939 – George Archer, American golfer (died 2005)
- 1939 – Geoffrey Whitehead, English actor
- 1940 – Phyllis Chesler, American feminist psychologist
- 1940 – Steve O'Rourke, English race car driver and manager (died 2003)
- 1940 – Marc Savoy, American accordion player, created the Cajun accordion
- 1942 – Herb Fame, American R&B singer
- 1942 – Jean-Pierre Jabouille, French race car driver and engineer (died 2023)
- 1942 – Bob Lanigan, Australian rugby league player (died 2024)
- 1942 – Robert Lelièvre, French singer-songwriter and guitarist (died 1973)
- 1942 – David Stancliffe, English bishop and scholar
- 1942 – Günter Wallraff, German journalist and author
- 1943 – Jean-Jacques Annaud, French director, producer, and screenwriter
- 1943 – Angèle Arsenault, Canadian singer-songwriter (died 2014)
- 1943 – Jerry Martini, American saxophonist
- 1943 – Robert Slater, American author and journalist (died 2014)
- 1945 – Rod Carew, Panamanian-American baseball player and coach
- 1945 – Donny Hathaway, American singer-songwriter, pianist, and producer (died 1979)
- 1945 – Ram Nath Kovind, 14th President of India
- 1945 – Ellen McIlwaine, American blues singer-songwriter, and slide guitarist (died 2021)
- 1946 – Dave Holland, English bassist, composer, and bandleader
- 1946 – Tim O'Brien, American novelist and short story writer
- 1947 – Dave Arneson, American game designer, co-created Dungeons & Dragons (died 2009)
- 1947 – Dalveer Bhandari, Indian lawyer and judge
- 1947 – Buzz Capra, American baseball player and coach
- 1947 – Aaron Ciechanover, Israeli biologist and physician, Nobel Prize laureate
- 1947 – Stephen Collins, American actor and director
- 1947 – Nevill Drury, English-Australian journalist and publisher (died 2013)
- 1947 – Adriano Tilgher, Italian politician
- 1947 – Martin Turner, English singer-songwriter and bass player
- 1947 – Mariska Veres, Dutch singer (died 2006)
- 1948 – Cub Koda, American singer-songwriter and guitarist (died 2000)
- 1949 – Isaac Bonewits, American singer-songwriter, liturgist, and author (died 2010)
- 1949 – Sheila Gilmore, Scottish lawyer and politician
- 1949 – André Rieu, Dutch violinist, composer, and conductor
- 1950 – Elpida, Greek singer-songwriter
- 1950 – Yvette Freeman, American actress
- 1950 – Susan Greenfield, Baroness Greenfield, English neuroscientist, academic, and politician
- 1950 – Mark Helias, American bassist and composer
- 1950 – Sigbjørn Johnsen, Norwegian politician, Norwegian Minister of Finance
- 1950 – Boris Morukov, Russian physician and astronaut (died 2015)
- 1950 – Randy Quaid, American actor
- 1951 – Brian Greenway, Canadian singer-songwriter and guitarist
- 1952 – Jacques Martin, Canadian ice hockey player, coach, and manager
- 1952 – Bob Myrick, American baseball player (died 2012)
- 1952 – Ivan Sekyra, Czech singer-songwriter and guitarist (died 2012)
- 1952 – Earl Slick, American rock guitarist and songwriter
- 1953 – Pete Falcone, American baseball player
- 1953 – Viljar Loor, Estonian volleyball player (died 2011)
- 1953 – Miguel Lopez, Salvadorian-American soccer player
- 1953 – Grete Waitz, Norwegian runner and coach (died 2011)
- 1953 – Klaus Wowereit, German civil servant and politician, Governing Mayor of Berlin
- 1955 – Howard Hewett, American singer-songwriter
- 1955 – Morten Gunnar Larsen, Norwegian pianist and composer
- 1955 – Jeff Reardon, American baseball player
- 1956 – Andrus Ansip, Estonian engineer and politician, 15th Prime Minister of Estonia
- 1956 – Gina Haspel, American intelligence officer, First female director of the US CIA
- 1956 – Theresa May, English politician, former Prime Minister of the United Kingdom
- 1957 – Kang Seok-woo, South Korean actor
- 1957 – Éva Tardos, Hungarian mathematician and educator
- 1958 – Martin Cooper, English saxophonist, composer, and painter
- 1958 – Masato Nakamura, Japanese bass player and producer
- 1959 – Mark Aizlewood, Welsh footballer and manager
- 1959 – Brian P. Cleary, American author and poet
- 1959 – Youssou N'Dour, Senegalese singer-songwriter, musician, and politician
- 1960 – Joshua Wurman, American scientist, Doppler on Wheels inventor, and storm chaser
- 1961 – Gary Ablett Sr., Australian footballer
- 1961 – Rico Constantino, American wrestler and manager
- 1961 – Corrie van Zyl, South African cricketer and coach
- 1962 – Attaphol Buspakom, Thai footballer and manager (died 2015)
- 1962 – Nico Claesen, Belgian footballer and coach
- 1962 – Esai Morales, American actor
- 1962 – Paul Walsh, English footballer and sportscaster
- 1963 – Jean-Denis Delétraz, Swiss race car driver
- 1963 – Mark McGwire, American baseball player and coach
- 1964 – Harry Hill, English comedian and author
- 1964 – Max Matsuura, Japanese songwriter, producer, and manager
- 1964 – Jonathan Sarfati, Australian-New Zealand chess player and author
- 1965 – Andreas Keller, German field hockey player
- 1965 – Cindy Margolis, American actress and model
- 1965 – Mia Mottley, Barbadian prime minister
- 1965 – Chris Reason, Australian journalist
- 1965 – Cliff Ronning, Canadian ice hockey player and coach
- 1966 – George Weah, Liberian footballer and politician, 25th President of Liberia
- 1966 – José Ángel Ziganda, Spanish footballer and manager
- 1967 – Mike Pringle, American-Canadian football player
- 1967 – Scott Young, American ice hockey player and coach
- 1968 – Rob Collard, English race car driver
- 1968 – Phil de Glanville, English rugby player
- 1968 – Mark Durden-Smith, British television presenter
- 1968 – Kevin Griffin, American singer-songwriter, guitarist, and producer
- 1968 – Jon Guenther, American author and engineer
- 1968 – Jay Underwood, American actor and pastor
- 1969 – Zach Galifianakis, American actor, comedian, producer, and screenwriter
- 1969 – Joseph Patrick Moore, American musician, composer, and producer
- 1969 – Ori Kaplan, Israeli-American saxophonist and producer
- 1969 – Marcus Stephen, Nauruan weightlifter and politician, 27th President of Nauru
- 1969 – Igor Ulanov, Russian ice hockey player
- 1970 – Simon Davey, Welsh footballer and manager
- 1970 – Alexei Zhamnov, Russian ice hockey player and manager
- 1970 – Vince Zampella, American video game designer (died 2025)
- 1971 – Andrew O'Keefe, Australian lawyer and television host
- 1972 – Ronen Altman Kaydar, Israeli author and poet
- 1972 – Nicky Morgan, British politician
- 1972 – Ayşe Yiğit, Belgian politician
- 1973 – Christian Borle, American actor and singer
- 1973 – Jana Henke, German swimmer
- 1973 – John Mackey, American composer
- 1974 – Keith Duffy, Irish singer-songwriter, dancer, and actor
- 1974 – Sherri Saum, American actress
- 1975 – Justin Leppitsch, Australian rules footballer
- 1976 – Denis Gauthier, Canadian ice hockey player
- 1976 – Ümit Karan, Turkish footballer
- 1976 – Richard Oakes, English guitarist and songwriter
- 1976 – Mark Švets, Estonian footballer
- 1978 – Nicole Atkins, American singer-songwriter
- 1979 – Curtis Axel, American wrestler
- 1979 – Rudi Johnson, American football player (died 2025)
- 1979 – Gilberto Martínez, Costa Rican footballer
- 1979 – Ryan Pontbriand, American football player
- 1980 – Sarah Drew, American actress
- 1980 – Antonio Narciso, Italian footballer
- 1981 – Júlio Baptista, Brazilian footballer
- 1981 – Tom Donnelly, New Zealand rugby player
- 1981 – Johnny Oduya, Swedish ice hockey player
- 1983 – Mohamed Abdelwahab, Egyptian footballer (died 2006)
- 1983 – Mirko Vučinić, Montenegrin footballer
- 1984 – Beck Bennett, American actor and comedian
- 1984 – Matt Cain, American baseball player
- 1985 – Nazimuddin Ahmed, Bangladeshi cricketer
- 1986 – Sayaka Kanda, Japanese actress and singer (died 2021)
- 1986 – Jurnee Smollett, American actress
- 1987 – Hiroki Aiba, Japanese actor and singer
- 1987 – Mitchell Aubusson, Australian rugby league player
- 1987 – Matthew Daddario, American actor
- 1987 – Gibran Rakabuming Raka, Indonesian businessman and politician, 14th Vice President of Indonesia
- 1989 – Brie Larson, American actress
- 1990 – Pedro Filipe Mendes, Portuguese footballer
- 1990 – Albert Prosa, Estonian footballer
- 1991 – Robbie Ray, American baseball player
- 1991 – Jennifer Dodds, Scottish curler
- 1992 – Xander Bogaerts, Aruban baseball player
- 1993 – Chris Green, South African-Australian cricketer
- 1993 – Lizaad Williams, South African cricketer
- 1994 – Trézéguet, Egyptian footballer
- 1997 – Jade Bird, English singer, songwriter, and musician
- 1998 – Daniel Gafford, American basketball player
- 1998 – Haumole Olakau'atu, Australian-Tongan rugby league player
- 2000 – Kalle Rovanperä, Finnish professional rally driver
- 2001 – Luna Blaise, American actress and singer
- 2001 – Mason Greenwood, English footballer
- 2002 – Livvy Dunne, American gymnast and social media personality
- 2003 – Fernando Mendoza, American football player
- 2006 – Priah Ferguson, American actress

== Deaths ==
=== Pre-1600 ===
- 630 – Tajoom Uk'ab K'ahk', Mayan king
- 686 – Emperor Tenmu of Japan (born 631)
- 804 – Richbod, archbishop of Trier
- 895 – Kong Wei, chancellor of the Tang dynasty
- 918 – Zhou, empress of Former Shu
- 959 – Eadwig, English king (born 941)
- 961 – Artald, archbishop of Reims
- 1040 – Alan III, Duke of Brittany (born 997)
- 1126 – Morphia of Melitene, Queen of Jerusalem
- 1246 – Ednyfed Fychan, distain of Gwynedd
- 1310 – Beatrice of Burgundy, Lady of Bourbon (born 1257)
- 1404 – Pope Boniface IX (born 1356)
- 1416 – Yaqub Spata, Albanian ruler
- 1450 – Leonello d'Este, Marquis of Ferrara, Italian noble (born 1407)
- 1499 – Marsilio Ficino, Italian astrologer and philosopher (born 1433)
- 1500 – John Alcock, English bishop and politician (born 1430)
- 1532 – Jan Mabuse, Flemish painter
- 1567 – Pietro Carnesecchi, Italian humanist (born 1508)
- 1570 – Frans Floris, Flemish painter (born 1520)
- 1574 – Maarten van Heemskerck, Dutch painter (born 1498)
- 1578 – John of Austria (born 1547)
- 1588 – Edward James, English priest and martyr (born 1557)

=== 1601–1900 ===
- 1602 – Hernando de Cabezón, Spanish organist and composer (born 1541)
- 1609 – Giammateo Asola, Italian priest and composer (born 1532)
- 1652 – Jan Asselijn, Dutch painter (born 1610)
- 1683 – John Hull, colonial American merchant and politician (born 1624)
- 1684 – Pierre Corneille, French playwright (born 1606)
- 1690 – Girolamo Corner, Venetian statesman and military commander (born 1632)
- 1693 – Pedro Abarca, Spanish theologian and academic (born 1619)
- 1708 – John Blow, English organist and composer (born 1649)
- 1768 – Robert Simson, Scottish mathematician and academic (born 1687)
- 1788 – William Brodie, Scottish businessman and politician (born 1741)
- 1819 – James Bunbury White, American politician (born 1774)
- 1837 – Robert Clark, American politician (born 1777)
- 1838 – Charles Tennant, Scottish chemist and businessman (born 1768)
- 1864 – Rose O'Neal Greenhow, American spy (born 1817)
- 1878 – Mindon Min, Burmese king (born 1808)
- 1885 – John Light Atlee, American physician and surgeon (born 1799)
- 1895 – Eli Whitney Blake, Jr., American chemist, physicist, and academic (born 1836)

=== 1901–present ===
- 1901 – Abdur Rahman Khan, Afghan emir (born 1844)
- 1913 – Eugene O'Keefe, Canadian businessman and philanthropist (born 1827)
- 1929 – Antoine Bourdelle, French sculptor and painter (born 1861)
- 1940 – Chiungtze C. Tsen, Chinese mathematician (born 1898)
- 1942 – Ants Piip, Estonian lawyer and politician, 7th Prime Minister of Estonia (born 1884)
- 1950 – Faik Ali Ozansoy, Turkish poet, educator, and politician (born 1876)
- 1951 – Peter McWilliam, Scottish-English footballer and manager (born 1878)
- 1953 – John Marin, American painter (born 1870)
- 1955 – Charles Christie, American film producer who founded Christie Film Company (born 1880)
- 1957 – Abdülhalik Renda, Turkish civil servant, politician, and sixth Turkish Minister of National Defence (born 1881)
- 1958 – Robert Falk, Russian painter and educator (born 1886)
- 1959 – Enrico De Nicola, Italian journalist, lawyer, politician, and first President of Italy (born 1877)
- 1961 – Ludwig Bemelmans, Italian-American author and illustrator (born 1898)
- 1968 – Romano Guardini, Italian-German Catholic priest, author, and academic (born 1885)
- 1970 – Raúl Riganti, Argentinian race car driver (born 1893)
- 1972 – Louis Leakey, Kenyan-English archaeologist and paleontologist (born 1903)
- 1974 – Spyridon Marinatos, Greek archaeologist and academic (born 1901)
- 1975 – Al Jackson, Jr., American drummer, songwriter, and producer (born 1935)
- 1984 – Walter Alston, American baseball player and manager (born 1911)
- 1985 – Ninian Sanderson, Scottish race car driver (born 1925)
- 1985 – E. B. White, American essayist and journalist (born 1899)
- 1986 – Archie League, American air traffic controller (born 1907)
- 1988 – Sacheverell Sitwell, English author, poet, and critic (born 1897)
- 1990 – Curtis LeMay, American general (born 1906)
- 1992 – Petra Kelly, German activist and politician (born 1947)
- 1994 – Paul Lorenzen, German mathematician and philosopher (born 1915)
- 1997 – Jerome H. Lemelson, American engineer and philanthropist (born 1923)
- 2002 – Walter Annenberg, American publisher and diplomat (born 1908)
- 2004 – Richard Avedon, American photographer (born 1923)
- 2004 – Bruce Palmer, Canadian bass player (born 1946)
- 2004 – Robert Vaidlo, Estonian journalist and author (born 1921)
- 2006 – Fawaz al-Rabeiee, Saudi Arabian terrorist (born 1979)
- 2006 – Jerald Tanner, American author and activist (born 1938)
- 2007 – Ronnie Hazlehurst, English conductor and composer (born 1928)
- 2007 – Chris Mainwaring, Australian footballer and journalist (born 1965)
- 2007 – Al Oerter, American discus thrower (born 1936)
- 2008 – John Biddle, American cinematographer (born 1925)
- 2009 – Cintio Vitier, Cuban poet and author (born 1921)
- 2010 – Ian Buxton, English footballer and cricketer (born 1938)
- 2011 – Sven Tumba, Swedish ice hockey player and golfer (born 1931)
- 2012 – Octavio Getino, Spanish-Argentinian director and screenwriter (born 1935)
- 2012 – Eric Hobsbawm, Egyptian-English historian and author (born 1917)
- 2012 – Mark R. Kravitz, American lawyer and judge (born 1950)
- 2012 – Moshe Sanbar, Hungarian-Israeli economist and banker (born 1926)
- 2012 – Shlomo Venezia, Greek-Italian Holocaust survivor and author (born 1923)
- 2013 – Arnold Burns, American lawyer, politician, and 21st United States Deputy Attorney General (born 1930)
- 2013 – Tom Clancy, American author (born 1947)
- 2013 – Imero Fiorentino, American lighting designer (born 1928)
- 2013 – Israel Gutman, Polish-Israeli historian and author (born 1923)
- 2013 – Ole Danbolt Mjøs, Norwegian physician, academic, and politician (born 1939)
- 2013 – Jim Rountree, American football player and coach (born 1936)
- 2014 – Lynsey de Paul, English singer-songwriter, pianist, and actress (born 1948)
- 2014 – Shlomo Lahat, Israeli general and politician (born 1927)
- 2014 – José Martínez, Cuban-American baseball player and coach (born 1942)
- 2014 – Robert Serra, Venezuelan criminologist and politician (born 1987)
- 2015 – Božo Bakota, Croatian footballer (born 1950)
- 2015 – Don Edwards, American soldier, lawyer, and politician (born 1915)
- 2015 – Hadi Norouzi, Iranian footballer (born 1985)
- 2015 – Jacob Pressman, American rabbi and academic, co-founder of American Jewish University (born 1919)
- 2017 – Stephen Paddock, American mass murderer (born 1953)
- 2017 – Dave Strader, American sportscaster (born 1955)
- 2018 – Charles Aznavour, French-Armenian singer, composer, writer, filmmaker and public figure (born 1924)
- 2019 – Karel Gott, Czech singer (born 1939)
- 2022 – Antonio Inoki, Japanese professional wrestler and politician (born 1943)
- 2023 – Tim Wakefield, American professional baseball player (born 1966)
- 2024 – Michael Ancram, English lawyer and politician (born 1945)
- 2025 – Jane Goodall, English primatologist (born 1934)

== Holidays and observances ==
- Armed Forces Day (South Korea)
- Beginning of the United States' Fiscal Year
- Children's Day (El Salvador, Guatemala, Sri Lanka)
- Christian feast day:
  - Abai (Syriac Orthodox Church)
  - Bavo of Ghent
  - Blessed Edward James
  - Nicetius (Roman Catholic Church)
  - Remigius
  - Thérèse of Lisieux
  - Protection/Patronage of the Theotokos (Eastern Catholic Churches)
  - October 1 (Eastern Orthodox liturgics)
- Day of Prosecutors (Azerbaijan)
- Ground Forces Day (Russia)
- Independence Day, celebrates the independence of Cyprus from United Kingdom in 1960.
- Independence Day, celebrates the independence of Nigeria from United Kingdom in 1960.
- Independence Day, celebrates the independence of Palau from UN trust territory status in 1994.
- Independence Day, celebrates the independence of Tuvalu from United Kingdom in 1978.
- International Coffee Day
- International Day of Older Persons
- Lincolnshire Day (United Kingdom)
- National Day of the People's Republic of China (People's Republic of China)
- Pancasila Sanctity Day (Indonesia)
- Tampere Day (Finland)
- Teacher's Day (Uzbekistan)
- Unification Day (Cameroon)
- Defender of Ukraine Day (Ukraine)
