= History of computed tomography =

History of radiation-based medical imaging

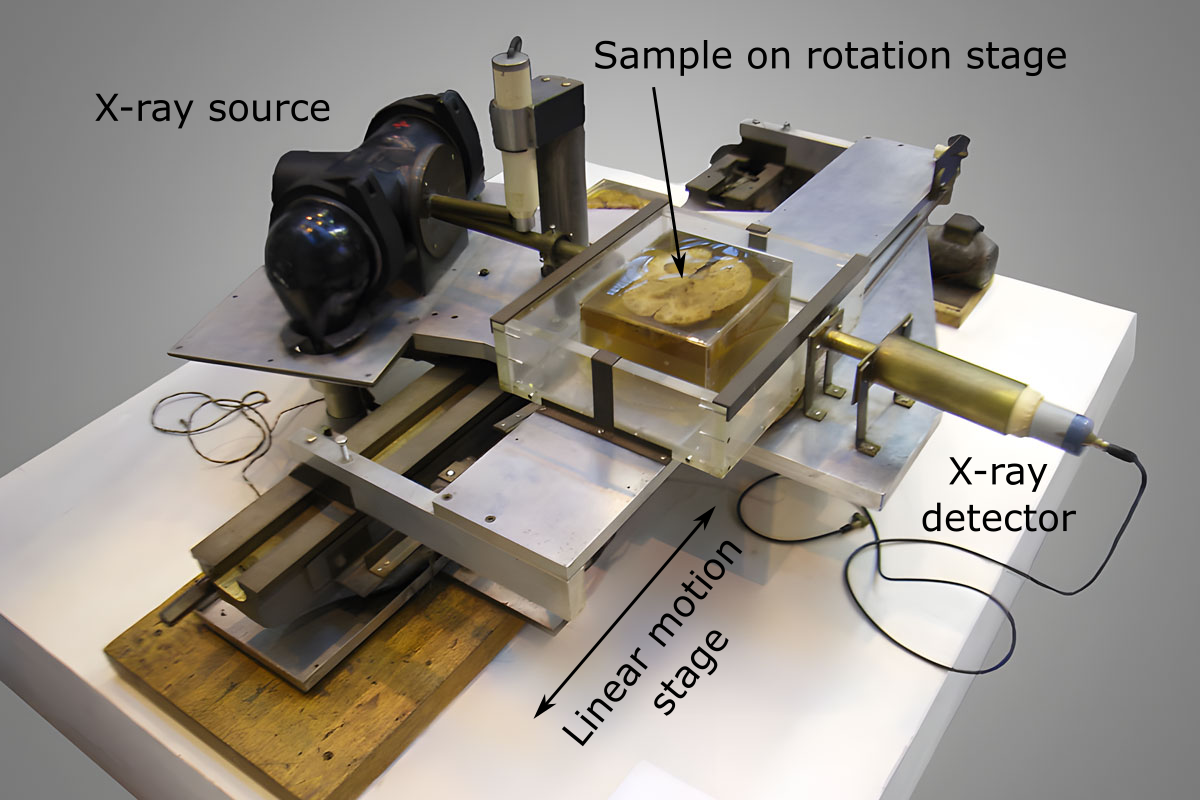
Hounsfield's prototype CT scanner realized with a pencil beam and a translate-rotate acquisition

The history of X-ray computed tomography (CT) traces back to Wilhelm Conrad Röntgen's discovery of X-ray radiation in 1895 and its rapid adoption in medical diagnostics. While X-ray radiography achieved tremendous success in the early 1900s, it had a significant limitation: projection-based imaging lacked depth information, which is crucial for many diagnostic tasks. To overcome this, additional X-ray projections from different angles were needed. The challenge was both mathematically and experimentally addressed by multiple scientists and engineers working independently across the globe. The breakthrough finally came in the 1970s with the work of Godfrey Hounsfield, when advancements in computing power and the development of commercial CT scanners made routine diagnostic applications possible.

== Focal plane tomography ==
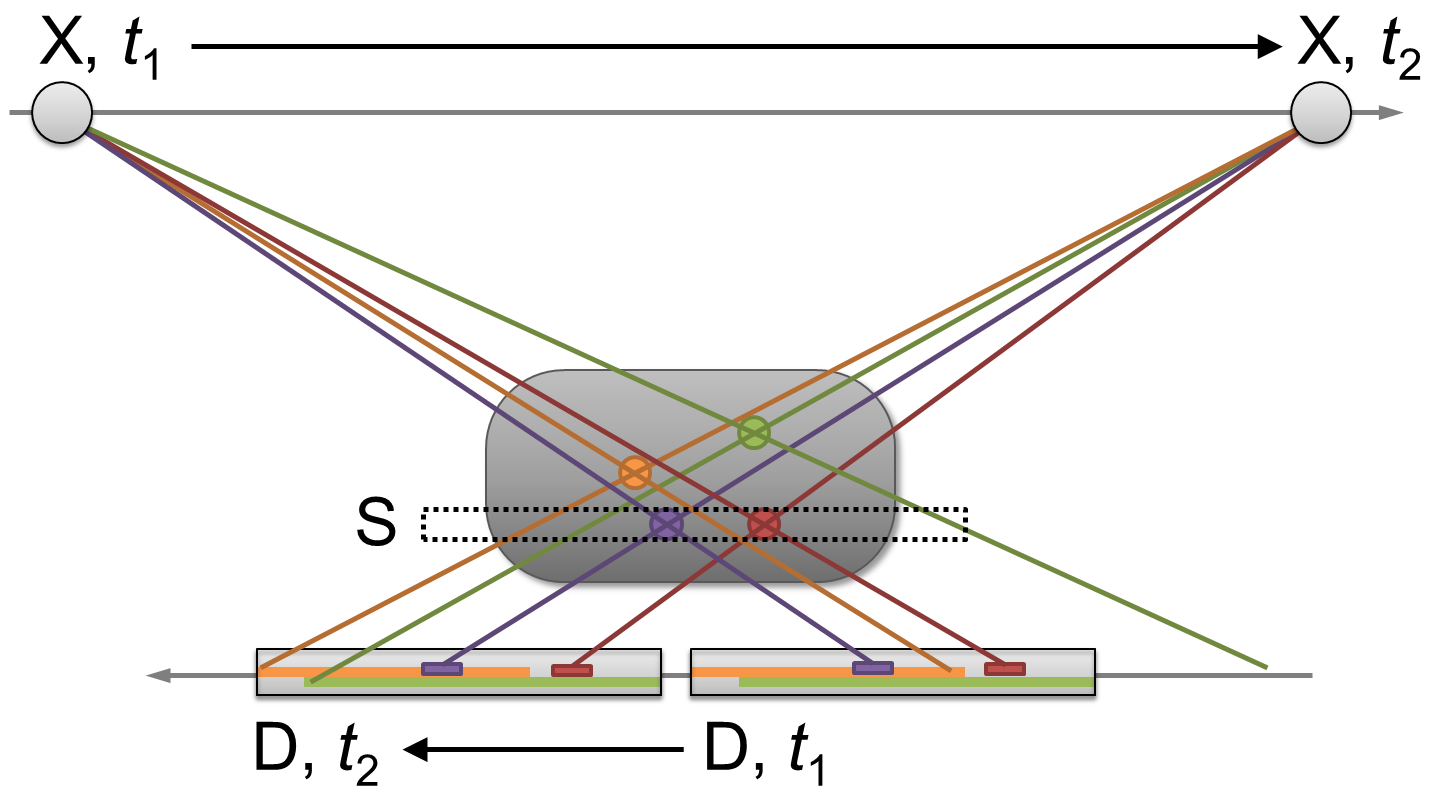
An illustration of the source and detector motion in focal plane tomography. Red and purple objects in the focal plane will remain sharp on the detector while the orange and green objects will be blurred.

Early attempts to overcome the superimposition of structures inherent to projectional radiography involved methods in which the X-ray source and the detecting film moved simultaneously along specific trajectories. These techniques were based on principles of projective geometry, allowing a particular plane (or slice) to be "focused" during exposure while structures above and below the plane were blurred. This approach became known as planography or focal plane tomography. Key contributors to its development included the French physician André Bocage, Italian radiologist Alessandro Vallebona, and Dutch radiologist Bernard George Ziedses des Plantes.

In 1961, neurologist William Oldendorf proposed a notable approach to imaging structures inside the skull. He developed an experimental setup using a pencil beam and a rotating sample with slow linear motion perpendicular to the beam axis. This allowed him to record variations in radiodensity within a test sample containing aluminum and iron nails arranged concentrically around the center, mimicking the structure of a skull. Oldendorf's method can be considered a form of focal point tomography, as it sampled points on a specific line or trajectory, while objects outside the center of rotation appeared blurred. In 1963, he was granted a U.S. patent for a "Radiant energy apparatus for investigating selected areas of interior objects obscured by dense material". In recognition of his contributions, he shared the 1975 Lasker Award with Godfrey Hounsfield.

These early tomographic methods, relying solely on mechanical techniques, continued to evolve throughout the mid-20th century, steadily producing sharper images and allowing for greater control over the thickness of the examined cross-section. This progress was driven by the development of more complex, multidirectional devices capable of moving in multiple planes and achieving more effective blurring of out-of-focus structures. However, despite these advancements in focal plane tomography, its ability to image soft tissue remained highly limited due to poor contrast.

== Mathematical solutions and first implementations ==
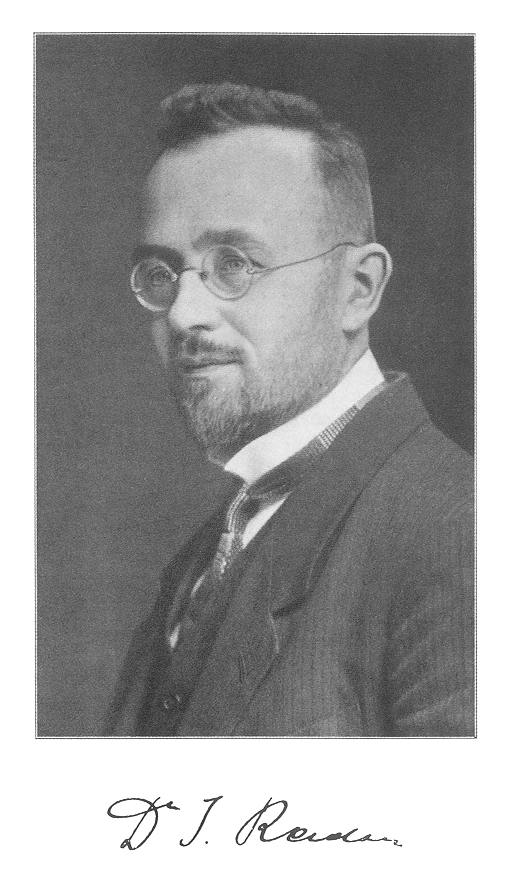
Johann Radon in 1920

=== Integral Equations and Radon Transform ===
To reliably solve the problem of X-ray passage through a plane at various angles, it was necessary to formulate an integral equation that accounted for the setup's geometry. Given the line integrals of a function $f(x,y)$ along multiple lines within the $xy$-plane, the goal was to reconstruct the original function $f(x,y)$. This kind of problem was solved by Johann Radon in 1917 who worked on integral transforms without having a certain practical application in mind. He became the eponym of the Radon transform and also provided its inverse solution needed for the image reconstruction.

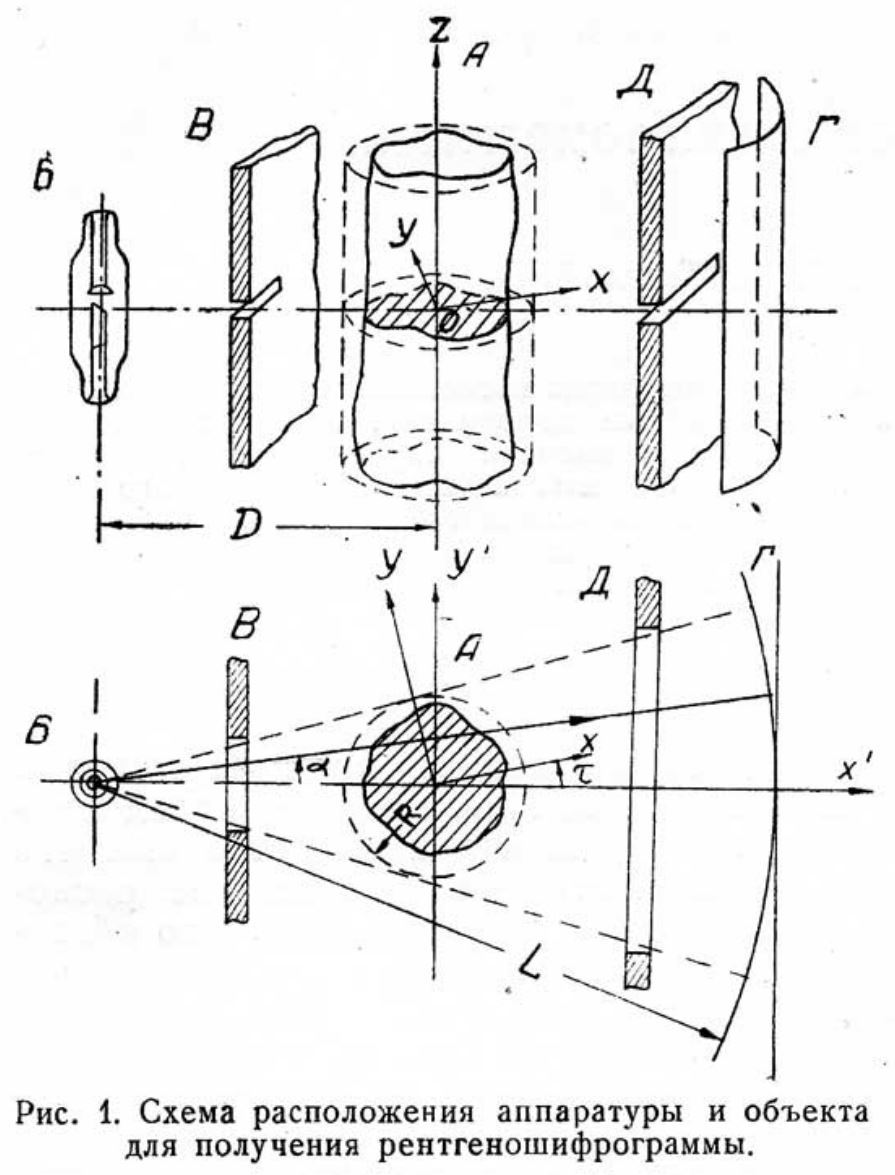
Figure for a fan-beam CT geometry where the sinogram should be recorded on a film proposed by Korenblum and Tetelbaum in 1958.

=== Tetelbaum and Korenblum ===
In 1957, Soviet scientists Semyon I. Tetelbaum and Boris I. Korenblum were the first to propose reconstructing the linear attenuation coefficient μ in a slice using angular radiographs. In their paper О методе получения объемных изображений при помощи рентгеновского излучения ("About a Method of Obtaining Volumetric Images by Means of X-Ray Radiation") they formulated the underlying integral equation and proposed a solution—without being aware of Radon's earlier work. As a practical implementation, they also proposed a collimated fan-beam setup, in which a narrow line was recorded on film while the sample's rotation was synchronized with the film's orthogonal movement relative to the imaging plane, recording what is today known as a sinogram directly onto the film. Additionally, they described an analog computing device, utilizing hardware available in the 1950s, capable of performing the reconstruction and displaying the results on a TV screen. They estimated that a 100 × 100 pixel matrix could be reconstructed in five minutes using an analog computing device with a frequency bandwidth of up to 1 MHz.

In his paper, Tetelbaum also proposed performing scans using different wavelength ranges (i.e., spectra of different energies) and utilizing the dependence of μ on energy to obtain a "colored image, which could provide, e.g. in medicine, additional diagnostic possibilities". According to their 1958 paper, such a device was under construction in their laboratory at the Kiev Polytechnic Institute. However, no experimental results were published after 1958, likely due to the unexpected death of Tetelbaum in November of that year. Since their papers were written in Russian and published in Soviet scientific journals, they remained largely unknown in the West.

=== Allan Cormack ===
Meanwhile, Allan M. Cormack, a South African physicist working in the Radiology Department at the University of Cape Town, was also interested in obtaining cross-sections of the absorption coefficient of the body to optimize radiotherapy treatments. He described his motivation as follows:

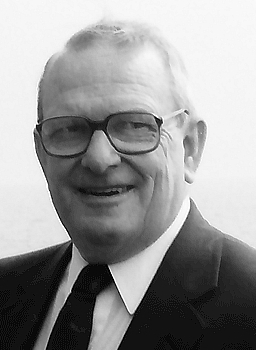
Allen M. Cormack in 1984

As I was working in the Radiology Department I could not help noticing the way in which X-ray radiotherapy treatments were planned. I was horrified by what I saw, even though it was as good as anything in the world, because all planning was based on the absorption of radiation by homogeneous matter approximating human tissue, and no account was taken of the differences in absorption between, say, bone, muscle and lung tissue. It struck me that what was needed was a set of maps of absorption coefficient for many sections of the body before one could more accurately plan therapy treatments. It occurred to me that these maps might be interesting in themselves, but I had no idea how interesting they would turn out to be.

He formulated the underlying integral equation and searched for its solutions in the mathematical literature. However, unable to find any references to Radon's work, he solved the problem independently and designed an experiment to validate his tomographic approach. The setup utilized a collimated $^{60}\mathrm{Co}$ gamma source and a Geiger counter, with both the source and detector moving linearly and scanning the sample with a pencil beam. For simplicity, he chose a sample consisting of a cylinder made of aluminum, encircled by a ring of wood, arranged symmetrically around the center of rotation. Due to this point symmetry, the recorded intensity pattern remained identical at all angles, making it sufficient to acquire data from just one angle to determine the linear attenuation coefficient within a plane of the sample. The results demonstrated a good agreement between the experimentally acquired data and the theoretical calculations. He published his results in two papers in 1963 and 1964, but received no feedback and chose not to pursue the project further until he learned about Hounsfield's work in 1972.

=== Godfrey Hounsfield ===
In the late 1960s, British electrical engineer Godfrey N. Hounsfield, who was employed by EMI and had led the development of Britain's first commercially available all-transistor computer (EMIDEC 1100), began exploring aspects of pattern recognition. Since EMI had nearly doubled its profits from The Beatles' record sales, it began investing a substantial amount of money into funding bold and innovative research ideas. In 1967, Hounsfield was given the opportunity to work on his own project and proposed tackling the tomographic problem, drawing inspiration from his earlier radar research. Instead of detecting patterns in the periphery using radar, he wondered whether it would be possible to detect objects inside a structure by sending beams through it from different angles.

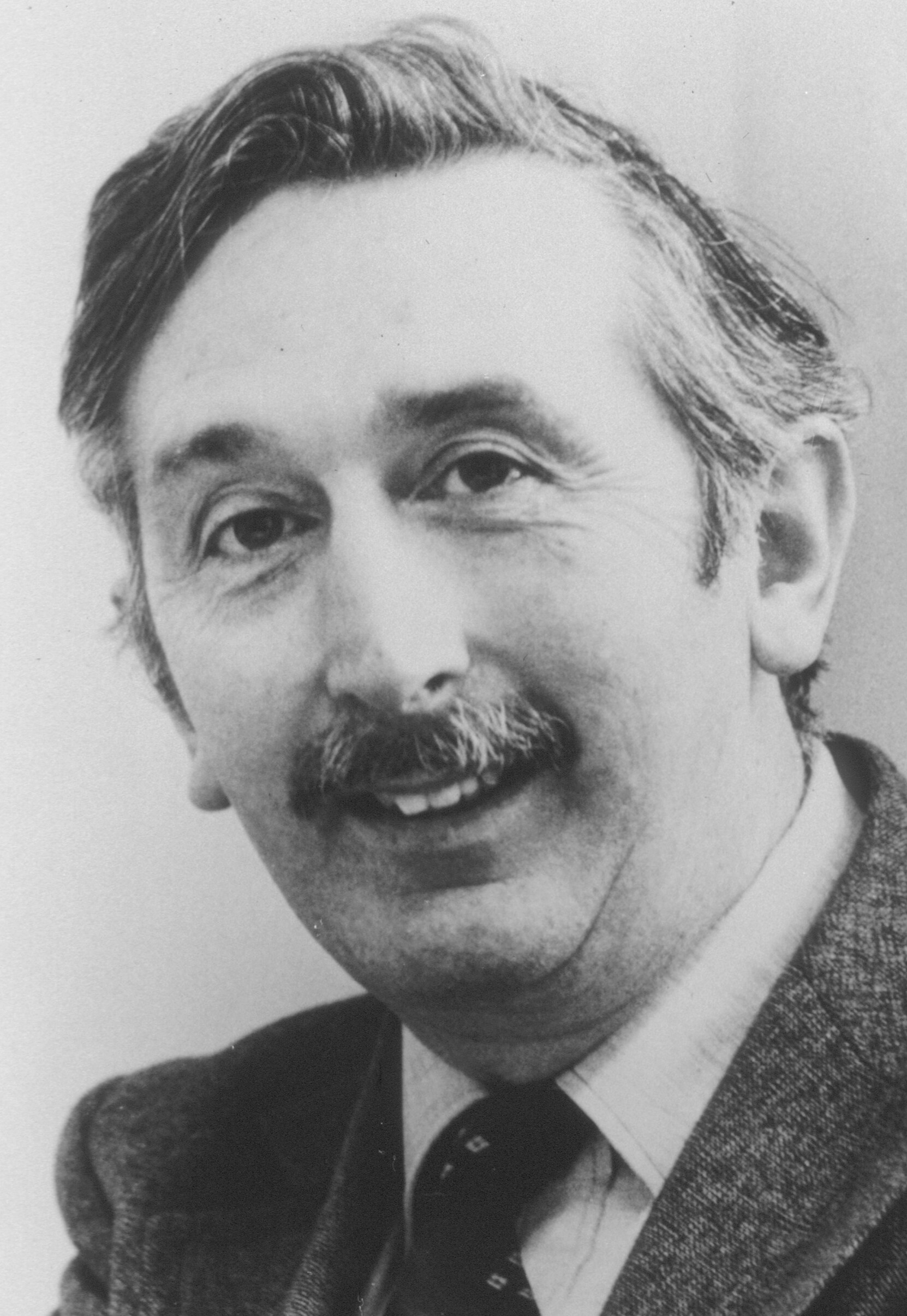
Godfrey N. Hounsfield in 1975

With additional funding from the UK Government Department of Health and Social Security, Hounsfield began developing a pencil beam scanner similar to Cormack's setup, using an Americium gamma source. Early successful measurements on samples such as bottles, water-filled jars, and pieces of metal and plastic took up to nine days to complete, acquiring 28,000 data points, which then required over two hours to process on a high-speed computer. Unlike his predecessors, Hounsfield had access to significant computing power and applied an algebraic reconstruction technique, using the Kaczmarz method from numerical algebra. Encouraged by the promising results, he justified the investment in an X-ray tube, a generator, and more sensitive crystal detectors, which soon enabled a significant reduction in measuring time. In 1968, the first promising scans of bovine brain samples were obtained, where white and grey matter could be clearly differentiated. In the same year, UK Patent No. 1283915 for "A Method of and Apparatus for Examination of a Body by Radiation such as X or Gamma Radiation" was granted to Hounsfield.

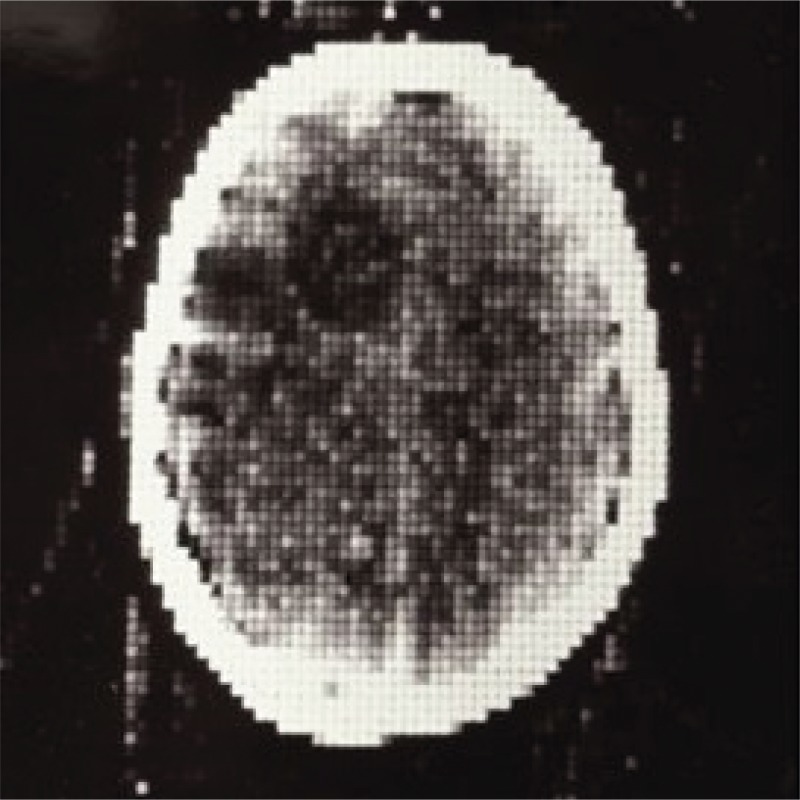
The first clinical CT scan, acquired in October 1971 at Atkinson Morley's Hospital in London with Hounsfield's scanner showing a circular cyst right in the middle of the frontal lobe.

When reaching out to radiologists at leading hospitals, Hounsfield was met with widespread indifference, and his proposals were often dismissed as unfeasible or of little practical value. However, he found a key collaborator in James Ambrose, a neuroradiologist at Atkinson Morley Hospital in London, after convincing him with an impressive image of a brain sample containing a tumor—supplied by Ambrose for a test scan. Over the following year, Hounsfield adapted his scanner for clinical in vivo application, designing it to keep the patient's head static while a rotating gantry moved the X-ray source and detector around it. The scanner was installed at Atkinson Morley Hospital, and on October 1, 1971, the first patient—a woman with a suspected brain tumor—was successfully examined. Over the following weeks, they successfully diagnosed brain diseases in several patients, aiding in surgical planning. When Ambrose presented these groundbreaking images at the British Institute of Radiology's Annual Congress in 1972, the conference participants were stunned. The clarity of the brain scans, revealing lesions, tumors, and hemorrhages, dispelled any skepticism and marked the beginning of a new era in radiology.

Hounsfield described the method, scanner design, and operation in his landmark 1973 paper, where he also introduced radiodensity units to which the reconstructed images were calibrated. Later, the eponymous Hounsfield scale was established, defining water as 0 HU and air as -1000 HU. For the introduction of computer tomography, the Nobel Prize in Physiology or Medicine was awarded jointly to Allan M. Cormack and Godfrey N. Hounsfield in 1979. The Nobel Committee stated in its announcement: "It is no exaggeration to state that no other method within x-ray diagnostics within such a short period of time has led to such remarkable advances in research and in a multitude of applications."

== Commercial scanners ==
After the public presentation of the first results in 1972 and the enthusiastic reception by the radiological community, several companies around the world began developing their own CT systems. Just five years later, no fewer than 17 companies were already active on the global market, offering commercial CT scanners. Progress was driven by innovations in various fields, including X-ray tube optimization, detector development, faster data processing, and advanced reconstruction algorithms. These technological advancements defined the different "generations" of CT scanners, ranging from the first to the fifth generation. In the long term, however, fan-beam CT devices using the rotate-rotate approach—known as third-generation scanners—have proven to be the most practical. Thanks to innovations such as rotating anode tubes, helical scanning, and slip ring technology, they continue to dominate the market today. Scanners with these developments have occasionally been classified as 6th generation by their manufacturers for marketing purposes, but the term has not become generally accepted.

=== First generation scanners ===
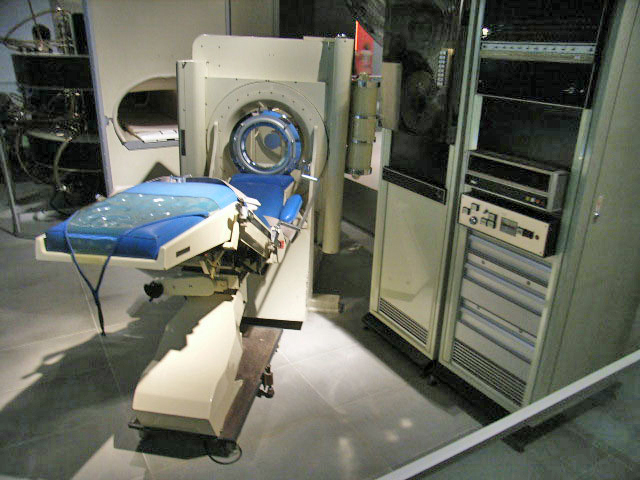
A historic EMI-Scanner Mark I, alongside the minicomputer used to process the CT image data

In first-generation CT scanners—such as Hounsfield's EMI Mark I design—the X-ray tube, typically operated at 120 kVp and 32 mA, emitted a narrow pencil beam aimed at a two-element detector (acquiring two 13 mm slices simultaneously), which consisted of sodium iodide (NaI) scintillators coupled to photomultiplier tubes. Both the tube and the detector moved linearly across the patient at a fixed gantry angle. After each traverse, during which 160 data points (two rows of 80 measurements at 1.5 mm intervals) were collected, the system rotated by 1° around the center of the bore and repeated the process, ultimately acquiring 180 projections within five minutes. The detector required gain and offset calibration at the beginning of each linear pass.

The patient's head was enclosed in a thick rubber sleeve inside a box filled with water. This "water bag" adapted the dynamic range of the X-ray signal, minimized beam hardening effects, and provided a consistent reference point for calibration of CT numbers and starting point for iterative image reconstruction. The 28,800 data points collected for two slices were stored on magnetic disks.

The EMI scanner was equipped with a Data General Nova 820 minicomputer featuring 32 KB of memory and a dual-sided 2.5 MB hard drive. The reconstructed images had a matrix of 80 × 80 pixels and a dynamic range from –500 to +500, with water defined as 0. Three types of image output were available: a numerical printout of reconstructed values, a digital grayscale display with 10 intensity levels (with adjustable windowing), and a Polaroid photograph of the screen. A typical patient examination was scheduled for 60 to 120 minutes and included 8 to 12 images of 13 mm slice thickness captured via Polaroid.

Devices of this generation were primarily dedicated cranial scanners, designed exclusively for imaging the head. In 1974, Robert Ledley developed the first whole-body CT scanner at Georgetown University Medical Center in Washington, D.C.—the Automatic Computerized Transverse Axial (ACTA) scanner. While conceptually similar to the EMI Mark I, the ACTA scanner offered a larger axial field of view of 48 cm and produced images with a matrix of 160 × 160 pixels. Imaging body parts other than the head presented particular challenges due to motion artifacts caused by breathing and the heartbeat. To address this issue, it was necessary to significantly reduce the scan time.

Companies that offered 1st generation CT scanners include EMI (Mark 1, 1972), DISCO (ACTA 0100, later sold to Pfizer), Siemens (Siretom, 1974), GE (CT-N), NS (Neuroscan CT/N), Ohio Nuclear/Technicare (Delta 25, Delta 50) and CGR (Compagnie générale de radiologie, Densitome).

1977 Dutch newsreel featuring the EMI CT5005 body scanner - a second generation device with translate-rotate acquisition.

=== Second generation scanners ===
To achieve faster scan speeds, the narrow pencil X-ray beam was expanded into a fan-shaped beam and paired with multiple detectors—often more than ten. This configuration enabled the system to sample the object along several lines simultaneously, significantly reducing the number of rotations required for image reconstruction, though the translate-rotate protocol was still employed. For instance, EMI's second-generation CT 5000 series, introduced in 1975, featured 30 detectors spanning over 10°, which reduced scanning time to just 20 seconds per slice—fast enough to image certain body parts during a single breath-hold.

The rapidly growing market soon attracted serious competitors to EMI, including Siemens, Hitachi, GE, and several smaller manufacturers, many of whom introduced first- and second-generation scanners. While some of the smaller entrants brought innovative designs to the table, they often struggled to produce large numbers of reliable systems. A notable newcomer was Ohio Nuclear (later Technicare), which launched its successful Delta Scan series. This system offered a 256 × 256 image matrix, a two-minute scan time, and advanced, user-friendly software. Demand was so strong that, at the 1975 RSNA conference, customers placed $50,000 deposits simply to reserve a spot in the delivery queue.

Although second-generation systems offered substantial improvements in scan speed, the translate-rotate method still imposed a lower limit of around 20 seconds per slice. For many clinical applications, even faster scanning was necessary—prompting the move toward eliminating the translate motion entirely.

=== Third generation scanners ===
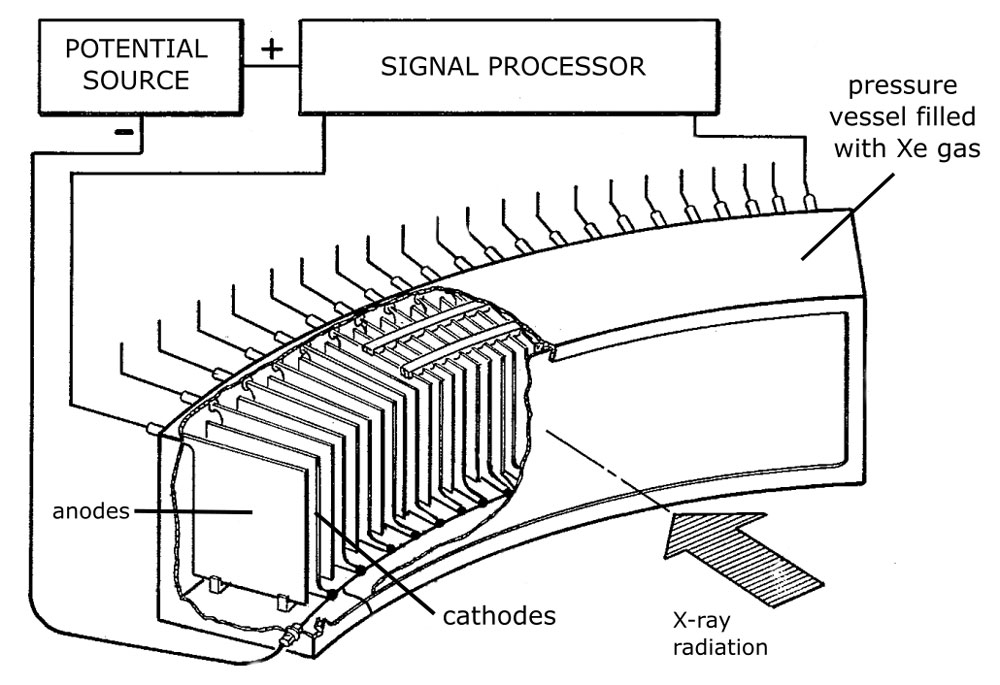
Sketch of the Xenon ionization chamber detector for CT based on a design from Whetten and Houston.

The use of a wide fan beam to illuminate the entire field of view was a logical advancement, first envisioned by Tetelbaum and Korenblum in 1958 and later by Hounsfield in his early project proposal at EMI in 1968, as well as in his patents. To accommodate this configuration, a larger detector array was arranged in a curved arc along the gantry, enabling it to capture the full width of the fan beam. As a result, a translational movement was no longer necessary to acquire a complete projection, giving rise to the "rotate-rotate" system—where both the X-ray tube and the detector array rotate around the patient.

In 1973, David Chesler, a scientist at Massachusetts General Hospital who had previously conducted pioneering work in positron emission tomography (PET), secured funding from the National Institutes of Health (NIH) to develop a CT body scanner utilizing a fan-beam design. His system aimed for a scan time of 5 seconds and featured filtered back-projection reconstruction, a bow-tie filter to reduce beam-hardening artifacts, and quarter-offset alignment to minimize aliasing. Compact detector designs based on Xenon ionization chambers were pivotal to the advancement of third-generation CT scanners.

Driven by the urgent need for faster CT scanning, the NIH and the National Cancer Institute (NCI) offered a $1 million award for the most promising proposal to develop a high-speed, whole-body CT scanner in late 1974. This led to intense competition and sparked the formation of several collaborations between academic institutions and industry. Competing manufacturers crafted ambitious R&D strategies, which they were required to submit along with their proposals.

Pioneering work in detector development was conducted by Douglas P. Boyd at Stanford University, as well as N. R. Whetten and J. M. Houston at GE. In these systems, Xenon gas was compressed within chambers to pressures of 20–30 atmospheres. The chambers contained bias and signal electrodes designed to collect electrons generated by xenon ionization events resulting from X-ray absorption. With cell depths of several centimeters, these detectors achieved detective quantum efficiencies of around 50% for the X-ray spectra used. They also demonstrated superior stability and linearity compared to earlier technologies and the electrodes simultaneously served as anti-scatter grids. Most third-generation CT systems adopted xenon ionization chambers in combination with pulsed X-ray sources, which helped reduce motion blur and offered improved control over radiation dose.

One notable example is the V360-3 CT system introduced by Varian Associates in 1976. It featured a 301-channel ionization chamber, a pulsed X-ray source, and a continuously rotating gantry enabled by early slip-ring technology—allowing for a scan time of just 3 seconds per slice. An alternative detector concept was introduced by Siemens in its 1977 Somatom system, which featured an array of cesium iodide (CsI) scintillators coupled to photodiodes and a rotation time of 4 seconds. Notable innovations included a high-heat-capacity X-ray tube and fast image reconstruction, with filtered backprojection initiated during the scan itself.

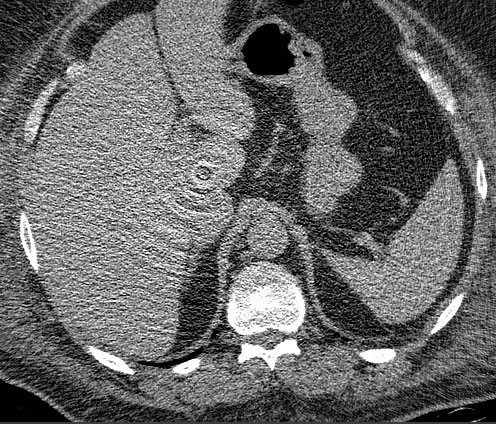
Ring artifacts on a CT abdomen scan can obscure pathology.

While third-generation systems brought significant improvements in scan speed, they also introduced new challenges—most notably, ring artifacts. These arose from calibration drifts in individual detector channels during the scan, as calibration could only be performed before or after imaging, when the patient was not in the beam. Another issue was aliasing artifacts, caused by the lack of crosstalk between detector channels. These occurred when projections contained periodic features at or below the spatial sampling limit defined by the Nyquist frequency of the detector array.

One of the central questions of the time was whether these problems could be addressed through technological advancements within the rotate-rotate architecture, or whether an alternative scanning approach would be required. While alternative designs were already in development in the late 1970s and gained traction in the 1980s and 1990s, the third-generation concept ultimately returned to dominance and remains the foundation of modern CT scanner design today.

Prominent manufacturers of third-generation CT systems included GE, Siemens, Varian, Searle, CGR, Artronix, Elscint, Philips, Toshiba, Hitachi, Shimadzu, and others.

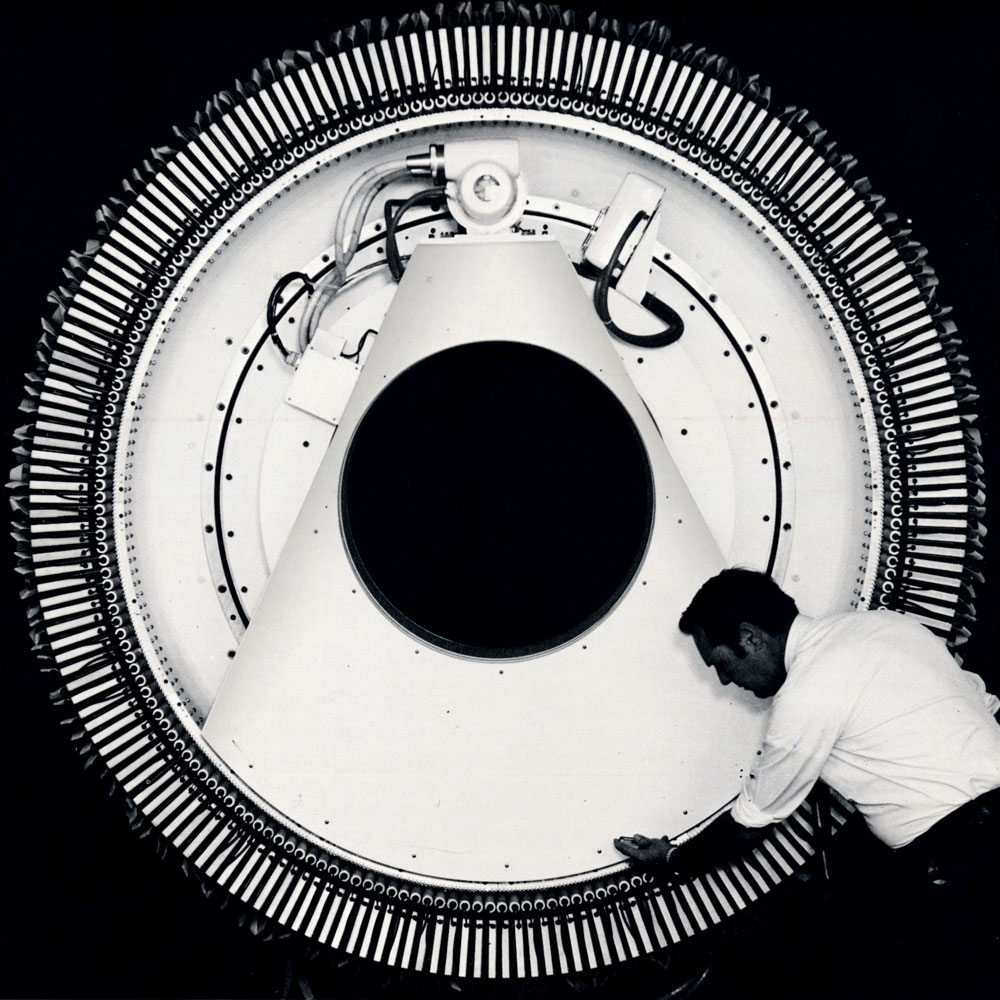
Fourth-generation AS&E CT scanner (1976), featuring a fully covered ring of static detectors.

=== Fourth generation scanners ===
Parallel to the development of third-generation CT systems, alternative approaches aimed at reducing mechanical complexity and avoiding moving parts. Specifically, designs using static detector arrays that spanned the entire gantry circumference were explored. In these systems, only the X-ray source rotated, leading to what became known as the rotate-static or fourth-generation architecture.

One prominent pioneer of this approach was Sadek Hilal at Columbia-Presbyterian Medical Center, who won the 1974 NIH/NCI RFP competition, receiving a $1 million grant to develop a high-speed CT scanner. Collaborating with American Science and Engineering (AS&E), the team pursued a design using bismuth germanate (BGO) detectors coupled to photomultipliers. This new approach eliminated detector calibration issues and got rid of ring artifacts since a single detector cell now measured radiation coming from different fan angles depending on the X-ray source position. In 1977, AS&E introduced their fourth-generation scanner, featuring 600 detector cells, a 512 × 512 image matrix, 5-second scan times, and sub-millimeter in-plane resolution—a major leap forward at the time. However, the NIH funding of the project led to an intellectual property dispute, and AS&E's attempt to obtain an exclusive license raised concerns about public interest. As a result, no patents were ultimately granted to AS&E. Meanwhile, other companies adopted similar fourth-generation designs, rapidly advancing the technology and reducing scan times to as little as 1 second.

Although the new design resolved the issue of ring artifacts, it introduced other challenges—most notably, a relatively high skin radiation dose due to the X-ray source being positioned closer to the patient, and a reduction in image quality caused by increased in-plane scatter, which could not be effectively eliminated using a focused anti-scatter grid as in third-generation systems. Additionally, the greater detector coverage led to significantly higher costs. While various innovative attempts were made to address these issues, they ultimately failed to outperform systems based on the rotate-rotate principle and were gradually phased out by the late 1990s.

Patent illustration showing a cutaway view of an electron beam computed tomography (EBCT) system.

=== Fifth generation scanners (Electron Beam CT) ===
Electron Beam CT (EBCT), another major innovation in CT imaging sought to eliminate mechanically moving parts entirely by employing both a static detector array and a static X-ray source. This was achieved using a large semi-circular tungsten anode made of multiple arcs, across which an electron beam was electronically swept. One such system, the Imatron C-100, was developed by Douglas P. Boyd at the University of California, San Francisco, and introduced in 1981, offering an unprecedented temporal resolution of 33–100 ms.

The scanner featured an electron gun and magnetic beam deflection system, similar to those in cathode-ray tubes (CRTs), allowing the electron beam to be rapidly steered across multiple 6-foot circular tungsten anode arcs—four in the initial system—covering 210°. The entire electron path was contained within a vacuum chamber, resulting in a large physical footprint, particularly on one side of the gantry. The upper part of the system was equipped with two rows of detectors, comprising 432 scintillator-photodiode elements also spanning 210°, designed to capture the X-ray fan beam generated by the rapidly moving focal spot. With four anode tracks and two detector rows, the system could generate eight image slices in under 1s.

This design was specifically optimized for cardiac imaging, as the heart's rapid motion makes it highly susceptible to motion artifacts. It enabled advanced applications such as coronary calcium scoring and other heart-related diagnostics. EBCT was also used for pediatric imaging, where patients often struggle with breath-holding or remaining still during scans. Only much later did modern CT systems, with multi-detector and dual-source technology, achieve comparable temporal resolution, eventually displacing EBCT from the market. Its decline was due to several limitations: a large footprint, limited versatility for general imaging, high acquisition and maintenance costs, and lower spatial resolution compared to newer technologies.

=== Helical/Spiral CT ===
Open CT scanner featuring a continuously rotating gantry, enabling helical CT acquisition.

Until the late 1980s, CT scans were performed exclusively in axial mode, where the patient table advanced in small increments after each full 360° rotation of the gantry around the patient. In 1990, continuous gantry rotation became possible with the introduction of slip-ring technology, eliminating the need to reverse the gantry after every rotation. This advancement enabled the first attempts at continuously moving the patient table during scanning for faster data acquisition. Because the X-ray tube and detectors then moved along a helical path relative to the patient, the method became known as helical or spiral CT. However, this new acquisition mode introduced motion artifacts that made image reconstruction more challenging.

In 1989, German physicist Willi A. Kalender from Siemens developed a Z-interpolation algorithm that successfully eliminated these artifacts and implemented it in the Somatom Plus scanner. Within two years, other major CT manufacturers adopted the technique, and helical scanning became the new standard in CT imaging.

=== Multi-Slice CT ===
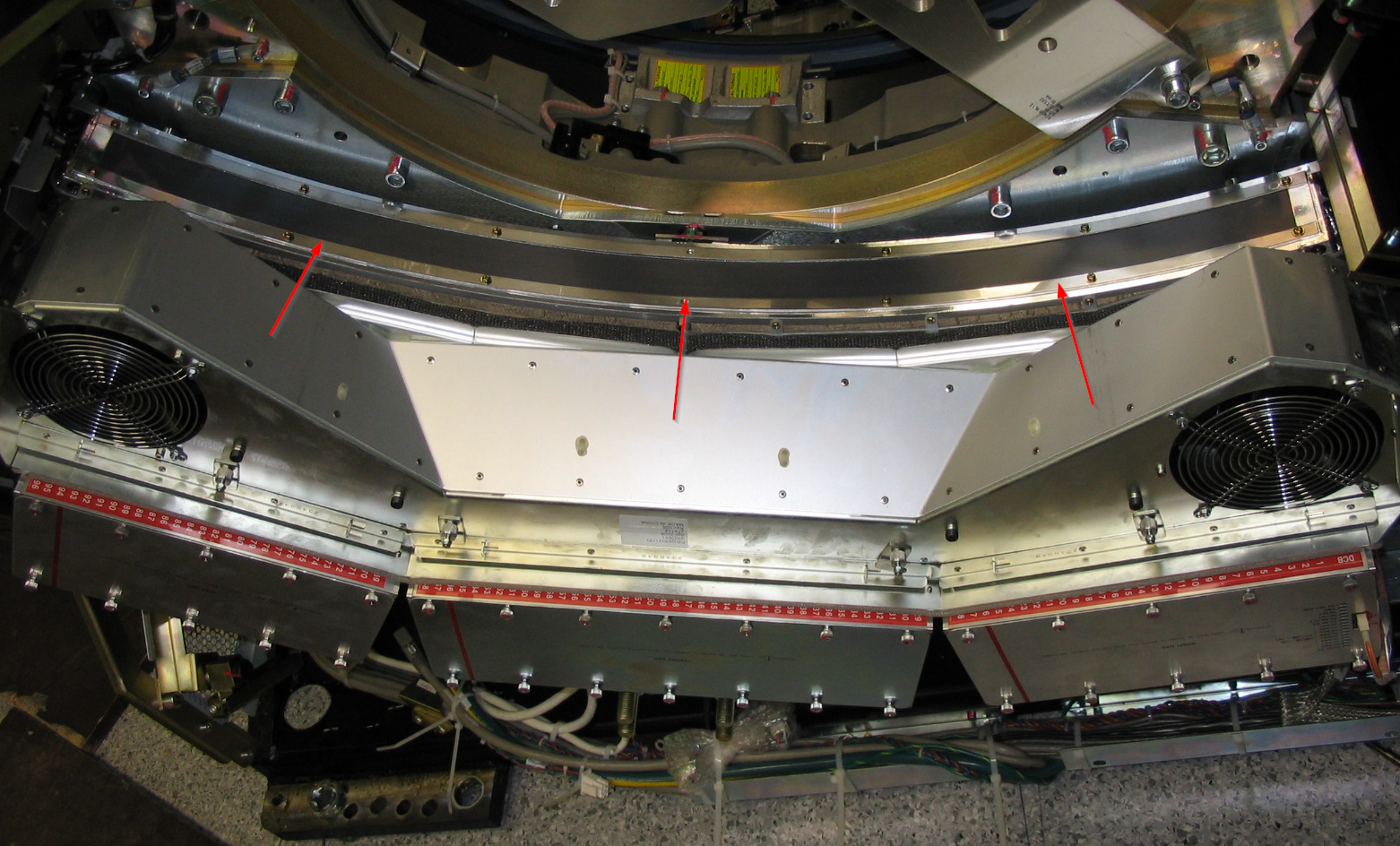
Curved detector array of a 16 slice CT scanner (GE Brightspeed 16)

Starting in the 1990s, CT detector technology transitioned from xenon ionization chambers to solid-state detectors. These new detectors used powdered scintillators (such as Gd_{2}O_{2}S) coupled with photodiodes to convert light into electrical signals. This advancement offered significantly higher quantum efficiency (>90%) and enabled more compact designs with improved spatial resolution. In 1992, Elscint introduced the CT-Twin scanner, which used a solid-state detector capable of acquiring two slices simultaneously. This innovation was soon adopted by other manufacturers, leading to a rapid increase in the number of simultaneously acquired slices: four in 1998, 16 in 2001, 64 in 2006, and up to 256–640 slices in today's state-of-the-art systems. Modern scanners now cover up to 16 cm of anatomy in a single rotation, allowing complete heart imaging without moving the table.

The combination of helical scanning and multi-slice technology enabled the acquisition of very thin slices, ultimately making isotropic voxel reconstruction possible. This means that anatomical data can now be viewed from any angle without distortion (multiplanar reconstruction), allowing the extraction, analysis, and visualization of accurate 3D models of the scanned structures. These capabilities have significantly improved surgical planning in fields such as neurology, orthopedics, and cardiology, and have also enabled more advanced calculations in radiotherapy planning.

=== Dual-Source and Dual-Energy CT ===
For specialized applications—such as differentiating materials with similar Hounsfield Unit (HU) values, tracking contrast agents, or reducing metal artifacts—it is beneficial to acquire scans at different X-ray energies. Leading CT manufacturers have developed techniques to achieve this dual-energy acquisition within a single scan.

In 2005, Siemens introduced the SOMATOM Definition, a scanner equipped with two X-ray tubes and two detectors mounted 90° apart on the gantry, each operating at different energies. This configuration not only enables dual-energy imaging but also delivers significantly higher X-ray flux, which is especially advantageous for cardiac imaging, achieving a temporal resolution of approximately 75 ms and resolving the heartbeat with minimal motion artifacts.

Other manufacturers, such as GE with Revolution CT and Canon with Aquilion ONE GENESIS, employ rapid kVp switching technology, allowing their detectors to separate and process both high- and low-energy data. Philips, in contrast, uses a dual-layer detector system (e.g. IQon Spectral CT) where the top layer captures mostly low-energy photons and the bottom layer detects more high-energy photons, enabling spectral differentiation at the detector level.

The acquisition of dual-energy data proves useful in clinical applications such as detecting uric acid versus calcium kidney stones, characterizing pulmonary embolism with iodine maps, and improving lesion conspicuity in liver imaging through virtual non-contrast and material decomposition.

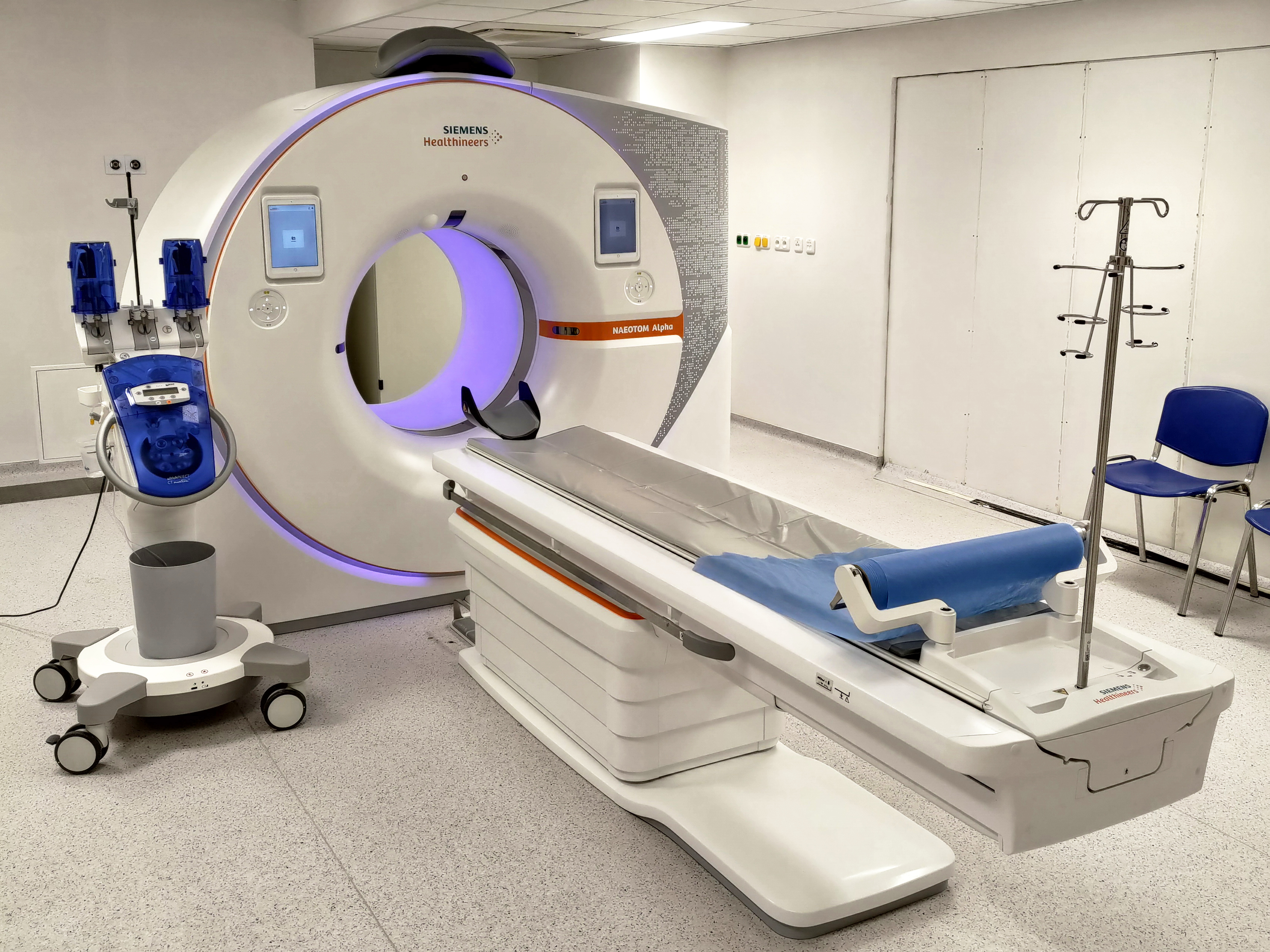
State-of-the-art dual source photon counting CT scanner Naeotom Alpha.

=== Photon-Counting CT ===
The latest advancement in CT detector technology is the development of photon-counting detectors. These systems use semiconductor materials such as cadmium telluride (CdTe) to directly convert absorbed X-ray photons into electrical charges, with the signal strength proportional to the energy of the photon. CdTe is composed of high atomic number elements, making it highly effective at absorbing X-rays and offering excellent detection efficiency. Its relatively large bandgap of 1.5 eV also allows operation at room temperature with minimal thermal noise.

When an X-ray photon is absorbed in the CdTe crystal via the photoelectric effect, its energy is transferred to an electron, which then ionizes atoms and generates electron-hole pairs. Charge collection electrodes separate these charges, and after amplification, the resulting signal is sorted into energy bins based on pulse height. This enables every photon to be individually counted and classified by energy at each pixel. As a result, photon-counting CT reaches an even better performance than dual-energy CT at material decomposition, and improves overall signal-to-noise ratio and dose efficiency.

In 2021 Siemens Healthineers introduced the first photon-counting CT scanner NAEOTOM Alpha equipped with two Vectron X-ray tubes and two QuantaMax detector arrays acquiring 144 slices (6 cm collimation width) with a gantry rotation time down to 0.25s. Other manufacturers have respective scanners in development and clinical testing. One notable system is the nu:view breast-CT scanner from the company AB-CT which also uses a CdTe photon-counting detector and has been in clinical use across Europe since 2017.

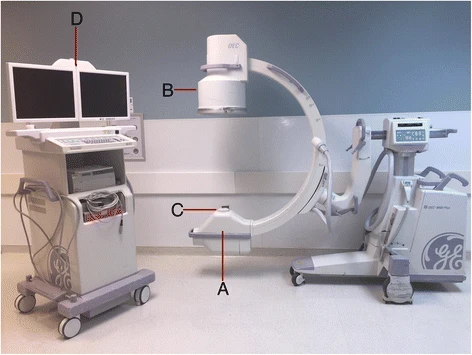
C-arm unit sometimes used for CBCT.

=== Cone-Beam CT ===
Unlike conventional CT scanners, cone beam CT (CBCT) utilizes the entire conical X-ray beam to acquire projection data and typically employs large flat panel detectors with pixel sizes ranging from 50 to 200 μm—similar to those used in chest radiography or fluoroscopy. Accordingly, CBCT systems use different acquisition protocols and cone beam reconstruction algorithms. The first systems entered the market in the late 1990s, such as the NewTom 9000 by QR S.R.L. in 1998, initially designed for dentomaxillofacial imaging. Since then, CBCT has gained popularity in orthopedic and veterinary medicine, interventional radiology, and surgical applications. Today, C-arm systems are CBCT-capable and have become powerful tools for intraoperative imaging, dental and ENT procedures, radiation therapy planning, and beyond.

3D rendering of a treehopper acquired by a micro-CT scan in biological research.

Dedicated cone beam CT systems have also been developed for non-destructive testing, industrial applications, and research since the mid-1980s. Unlike medical CBCT, these systems typically rotate the sample while keeping the source and detector stationary. Longer scan times and higher radiation doses are generally acceptable in such settings, allowing for much higher spatial resolutions. These systems can achieve resolutions better than 100 μm (microCT or μCT) and, in some special cases, even below 1 μm (nanoCT), making them ideal for material science, precision engineering, and biological research.
