= 2017 Guatemala orphanage fire =

Arson that resulted in 41 deaths in San José Pinula, Guatemala

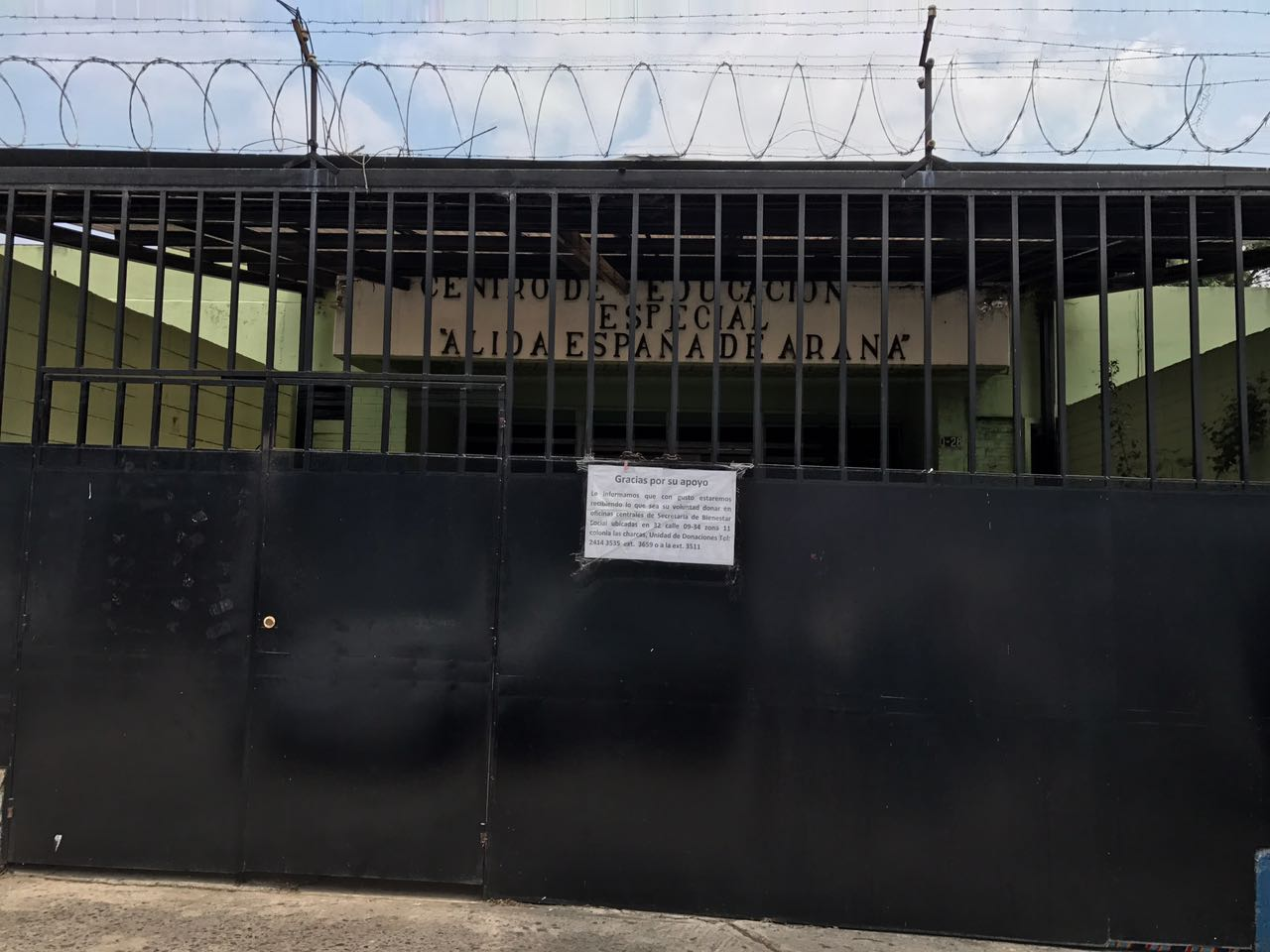
- Virgen de la Asunción Safe Home after the fire
- Date: 8 March 2017
- Time: 9:00 am Central Standard Time
- Venue: Virgen de la Asunción Safe Home
- Location: San José Pinula, Guatemala; 14.5764°N 90.4978°W
- Deaths: 41

The 2017 Guatemala orphanage fire occurred on 8 March 2017, at the Virgen de la Asunción Safe Home (Hogar Seguro) in San José Pinula, Guatemala. Forty-one girls, aged between 14 and 17 years old, were killed when a fire broke out at the orphanage. The girls had been locked in a schoolroom following protests, riots and an escape attempt which occurred the day before. In the aftermath of the fire, three government officials—including the country's Secretary of Social Welfare—were arrested and charged with crimes such as wrongful death and negligence.

== Background ==
Virgen de la Asunción Safe Home is a state-run children's home located in San Jose Pinula, about 25 kilometres (16 mi) away from the capital Guatemala City. The institution was built in 2010 and accommodates abandoned or orphaned children, as well as children with disabilities, drug addictions, or who are pregnant. Some have been institutionalized by the state after being abused by family members, forced into prostitution, or being homeless. Although the home does not house criminals, it does take in minors with legal histories who have completed their sentences, but have no relatives to take care of them.

The home has a capacity of around 350 to 500 youths, but was housing 700 to 800 at the time of the fire. Children were separated into different areas of the building based on age and gender.

=== Reports of abuse ===
Virgen de la Asunción has a long history of abuse allegations. In 2014, a contractor hired by the home was convicted of raping a mentally disabled 17-year-old girl. Two teachers have been arrested on charges of sexual assault.

Guatemala's Human Rights Ombudsman's Office (PDH for its initials in Spanish) received 45 reports of abuse between 2012 and 2016. On 2 November 2016, the PDH requested the Inter-American Commission on Human Rights to issue precautionary measures, citing evidence of mistreatment by staff and of a human trafficking network which recruited children from the home.

== Incident ==
=== 7 March ===
On 7 March, rioting broke out at the safe home, followed by a mass escape. The day began with protests against abuse, rape, and overcrowding. According to the Social Welfare Secretariat, the riot started at 2:00 pm when a group of adolescents climbed on to the roof and threatened guards and staff with metal objects. During the confusion, about 85 residents escaped and fled into the surrounding woods. Most were captured by police and returned to the home.

At around 10:00 pm, an officer of Guatemala's National Civil Police called president Jimmy Morales to inform him of the situation.

Upon returning to the home, the adolescents were not immediately allowed to enter the building. President Morales had directed the staff to keep the escapees separate because they had broken the law and represented a risk to the other residents. At 1:00 am, the escapees were let back into the building. The boys were returned to their dormitories, while the girls were sent to a schoolroom.

=== 8 March ===
Fifty-one girls were confined to a schoolroom. They were provided with mattresses, but not blankets. The National Police guarded the room over the night.

In the morning, the girls were not allowed to leave to use the bathroom. At around 9:00 am, a fire broke out in the schoolroom. The cause of the fire is undetermined, but witnesses claim the fire was set by adolescents in an act of protest. Two survivors recounted hearing girls shouting that they were going to "sacrifice so that everyone would know what they were living in there." Police who were guarding the room did not allow the girls to escape.

Nineteen girls died on the scene. Victims were transferred to hospitals in Guatemala City and the Shriners Hospital for Children in Texas. In total, 41 girls were killed by the fire. All were between the ages of 14 and 17.

== Aftermath ==
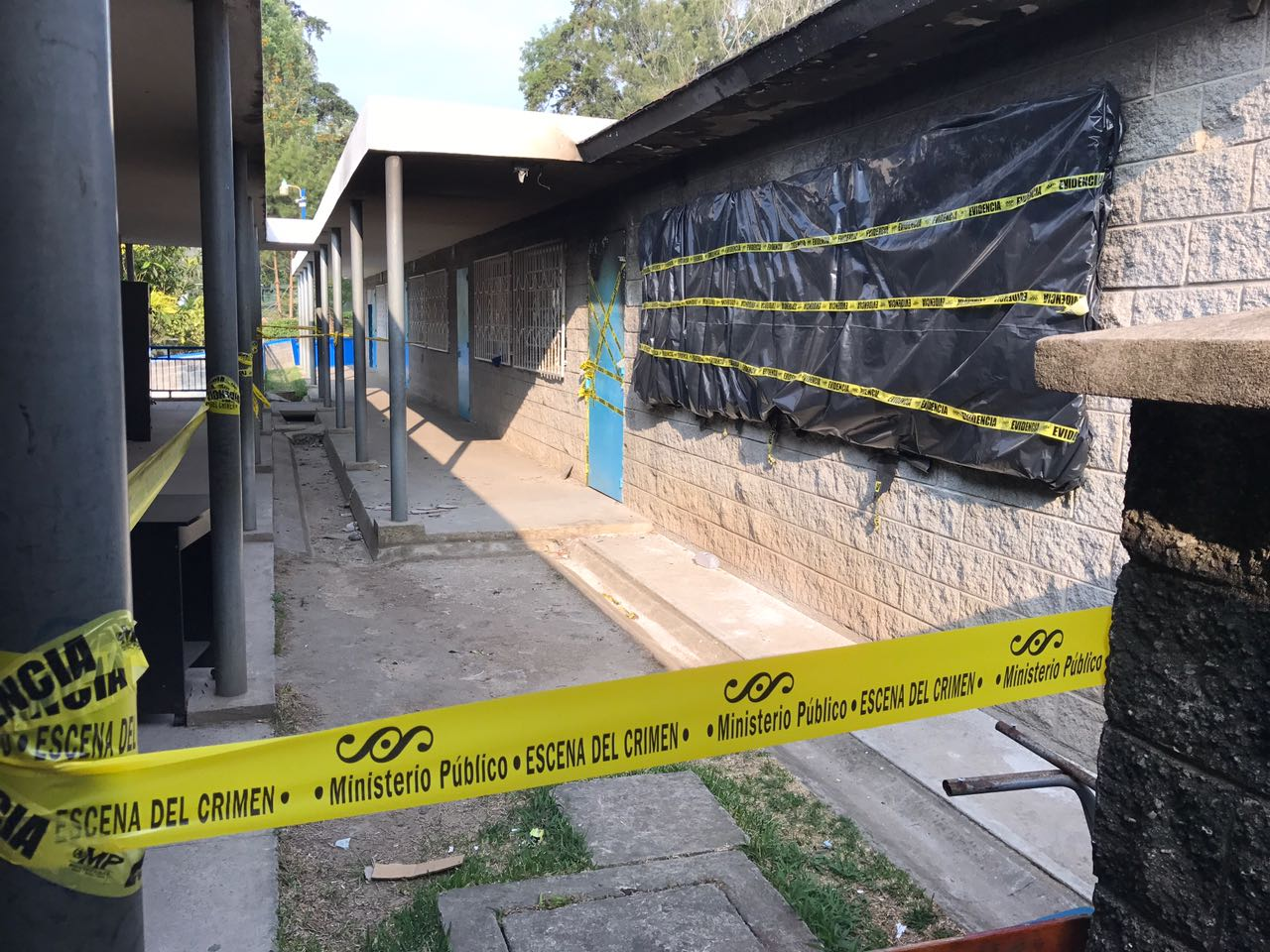
Exterior of the building after the fire, cordoned off by crime scene tape

Human rights advocates condemned various officials—including president Morales, the Attorney General, and the Secretary of Social Welfare—for failing to address the complaints about abuse of all kinds at the orphanage. A spokesman for the president instead placed blame on the court system.

Several members of the Congress of Guatemala called for the dismissal of Carlos Rodas, the Secretary of Social Welfare. Meanwhile, the Public Prosecutor began a criminal investigation of the events, collecting evidence including video from surveillance cameras at the home.

On 11 March, hundreds of people protested in Guatemala City against the perceived negligence, corruption and ineptitude of the Guatemalan government. Protestors walked through the streets of the city reading the names and ages of the girls who died. Chants included "it was the state," and "it wasn't an accident, it was an execution."

On the same day as the protests, Rodas resigned as Secretary of Social Welfare. President Morales announced he would "remove the line of command" at the safe home, and the Deputy Secretary of Social Welfare and the director of the home were both dismissed shortly after the fire.

=== Arrests ===
On 13 March, Guatemalan authorities announced the arrests of former secretary Carlos Rodas, former deputy secretary Anahí Keller, and former director of the safe home Santos Torres. Criminal charges against them included wrongful death, mistreatment of minors, and negligence. In June, two police officers were also charged for crimes related to the fire.

On 12 August 2025, Rodas and five other officials were convicted and sentenced to up to 25 years on charges of manslaughter and abuse of authority over the fire. The court also recommended an investigation against former president Morales for ordering police to work at the facility housing minors who had not committed any crimes.

== In popular culture ==
- Saria (2019), a short film that depicts the tragedy, was nominated for an Oscar in 2020.
- The events are fictionalized in the Guatemalan film Rita (2024).

== See also ==
- 2015 Guatemala landslide
- Burning of the Spanish Embassy
