= Invacare =

American medical equipment manufacturer

- Company type: Private
- Founded: 1885; 141 years ago
- Headquarters: Elyria, Ohio, U.S.
- Area served: 80+ countries
- Website: invacare.com

Invacare is a leading global manufacturer and distributor of non-acute medical equipment including wheelchairs, mobility scooters, beds, safe patient handling, pressure care and seating. Headquartered in Elyria, Ohio, the company currently distributes its product and services around the world. In February 2023, Invacare stated that it had filed for Chapter 11 bankruptcy for its North American entities only. It emerged from Chapter 11 in 2024 and continues to operate across Europe, Asia-Pacific and North America. It also has a growing presence around the rest of the world.

== History ==
The history of Invacare can be traced back to 1885 when the Worthington Company began to produce a wide range of wheelchairs. The product lines were expanded several times, but its main focus remained in wheelchairs.

In the 1970s, Invacare was owned by Technicare, a Cleveland medical device manufacturer. With Mal Mixon as its Vice President of Marketing, the company branched into the field of diagnostic imaging. Later in 1978, Technicare was acquired by Johnson & Johnson who subsequently put Invacare up for sale. Driven by the wish of running his own firm, Mal Mixon expressed interest in buying Invacare. Because of financial constraint, Mixon had to borrow $4.3 million and raise another $2.5 million in order to buy Invacare at $7.8 million. The transaction closed on December 28, 1979.

In 2008, after multiple acquisitions, Invacare was valued at $1.8 billion, and had sold its products to over 25,000 medical equipment providers in 80 countries.

In 2012, Invacare in North America entered into a consent decree with the Federal Government regarding certain products and facilities.

By 2013, the FDA had accepted two certification reports by an independent auditor, making progress toward removing the consent decree. In 2015, after a follow-up inspection, the agency informed Invacare that more work was required in both the company’s controls over its design process and design history as outlined in report two.

Although the third party auditor had submitted a third and final certification report whose acceptance could have lifted the consent decree, no review could be done on that report until the discrepancies noted in report two had been resolved.

In April 2017, the agency informed that company that it had accepted the revised second certification report allowing Invacare to resume design work in its Elyria, OH facility. The company is awaiting review and acceptance of the third certification report.

== Harvard Alumni Achievement Award ==
On September 27, 2007, A. Malachi Mixon was conferred the Harvard Business School's highest honor, the Alumni Achievement Award, by Dean Jay O. Light. The award was also given to Ayala Corp. chair Jaime Augusto Zobel de Ayala, Martin Sorrell, Donna Dubinsky and Hansjörg Wyss of Synthes.
