= San José Pinula =

Coordinates: 14°33′N 90°25′W

- Municipality
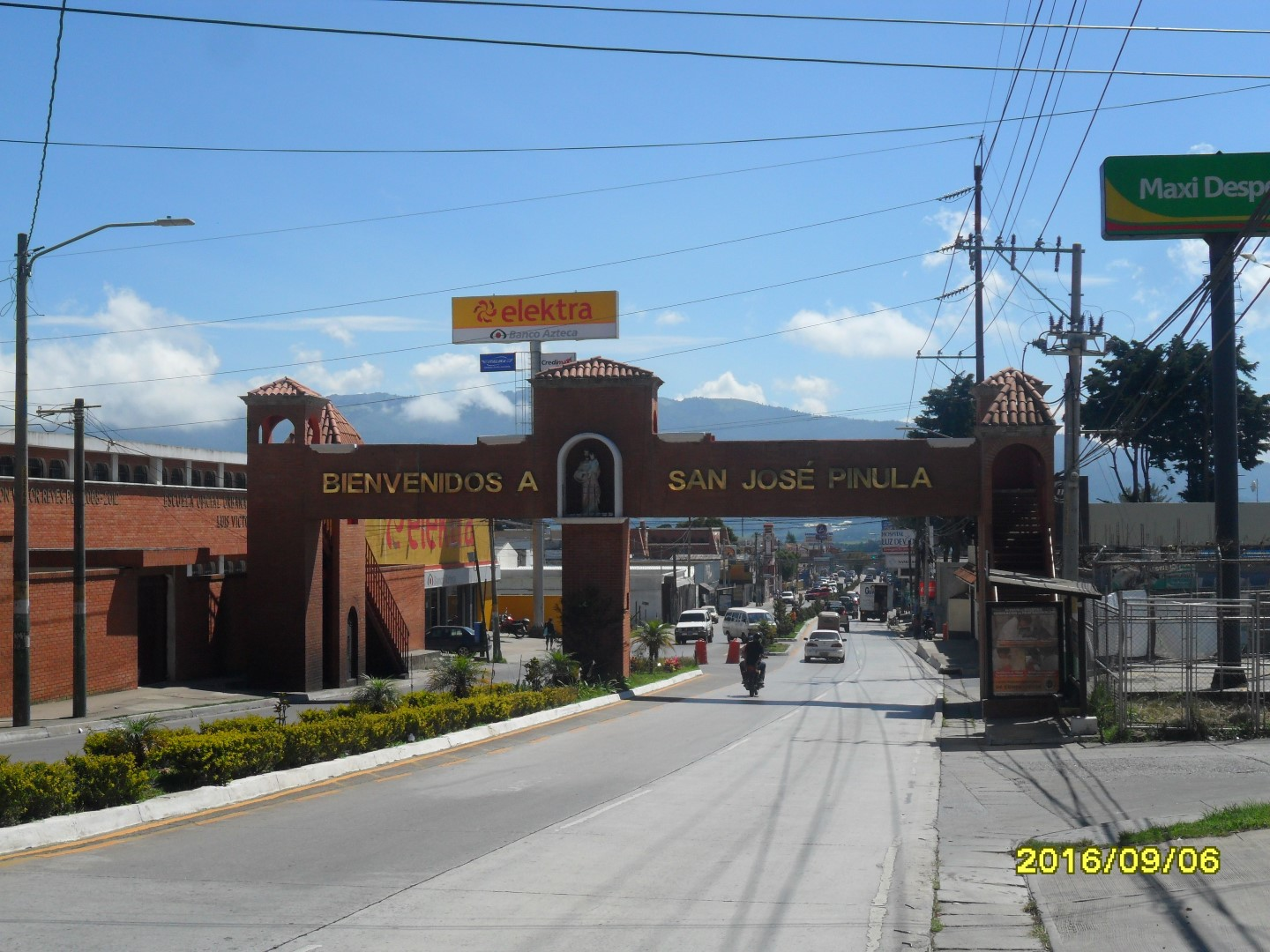
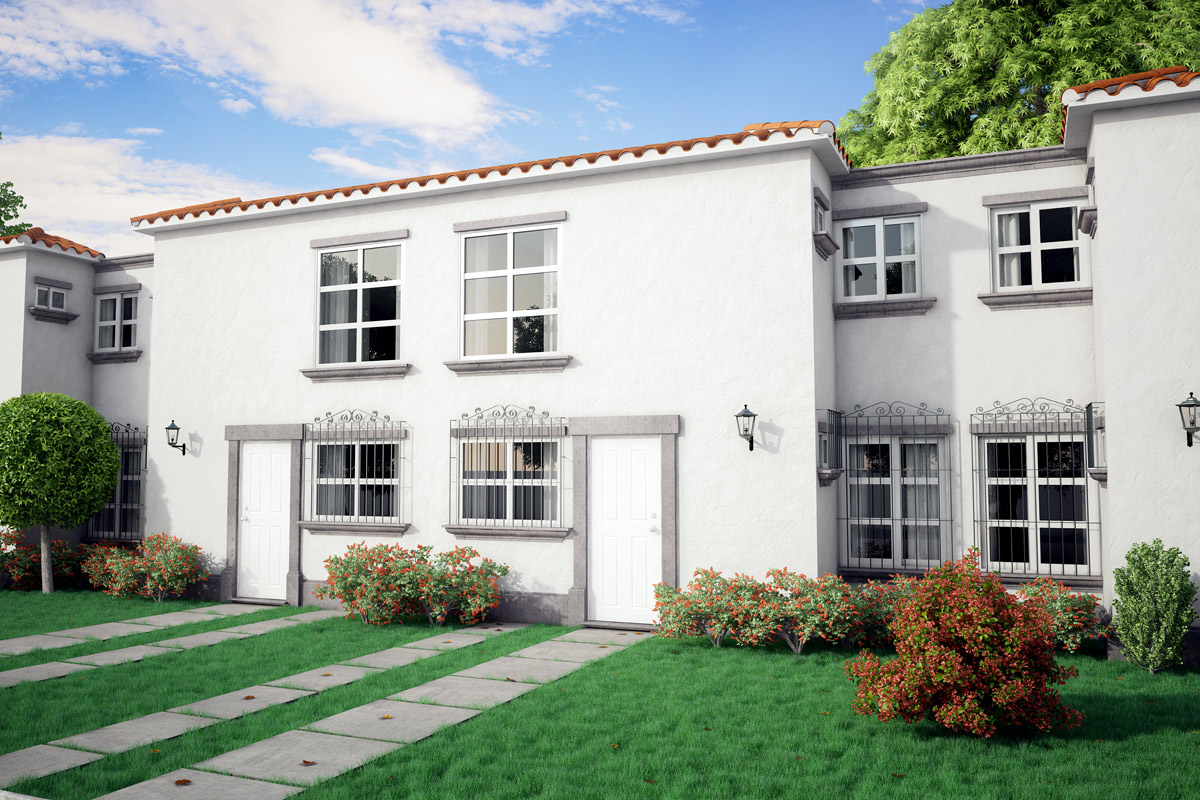
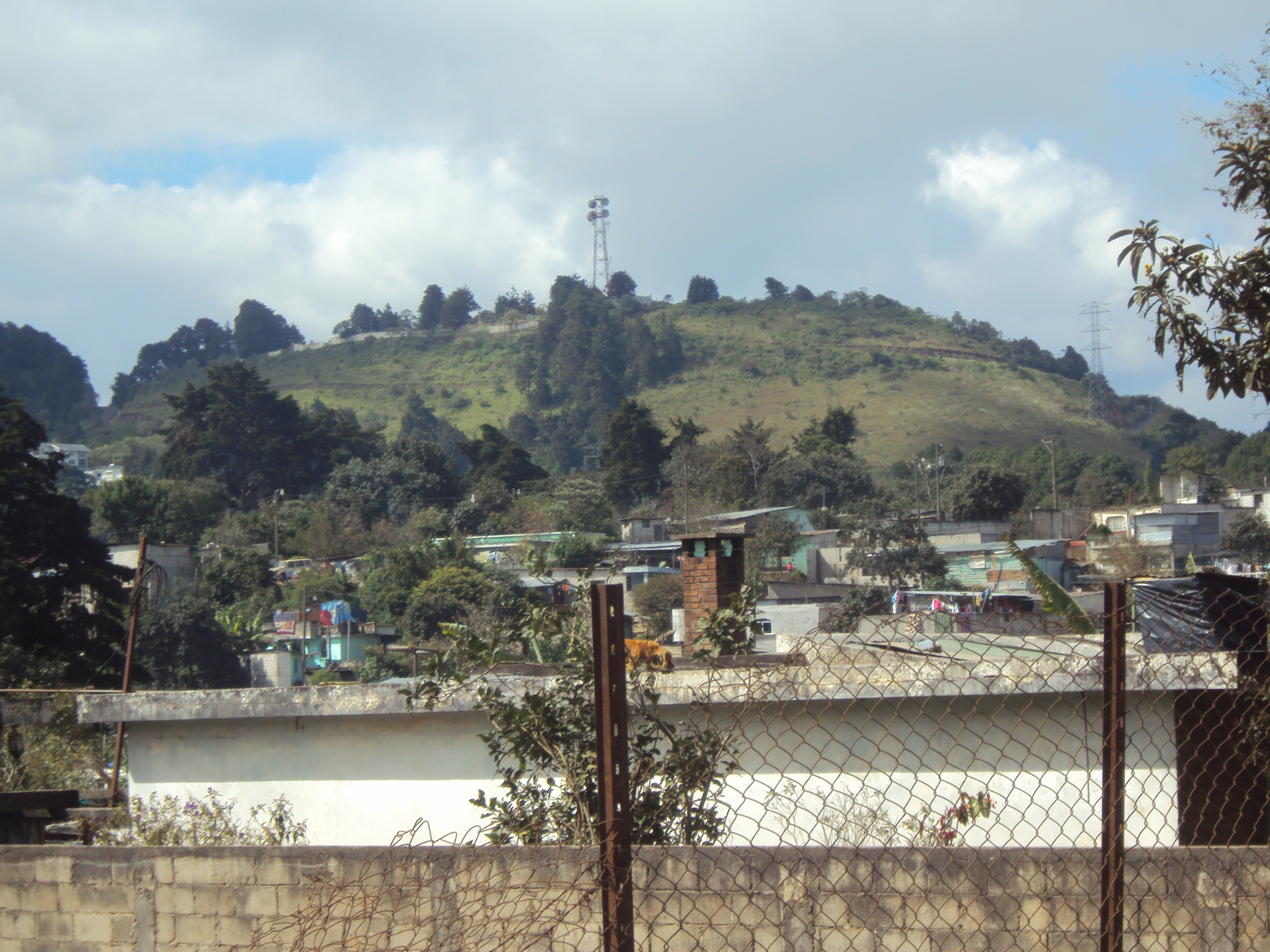
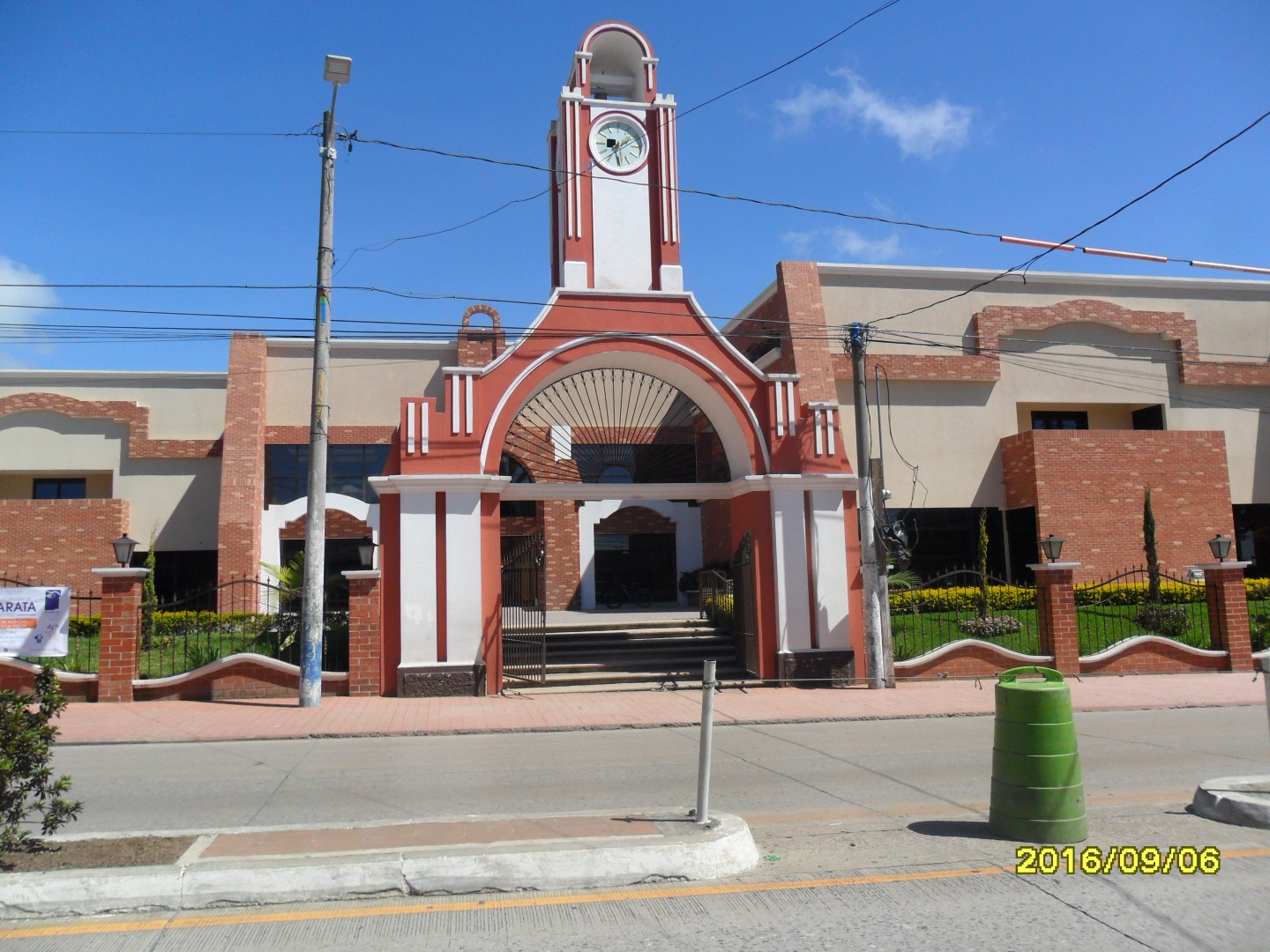
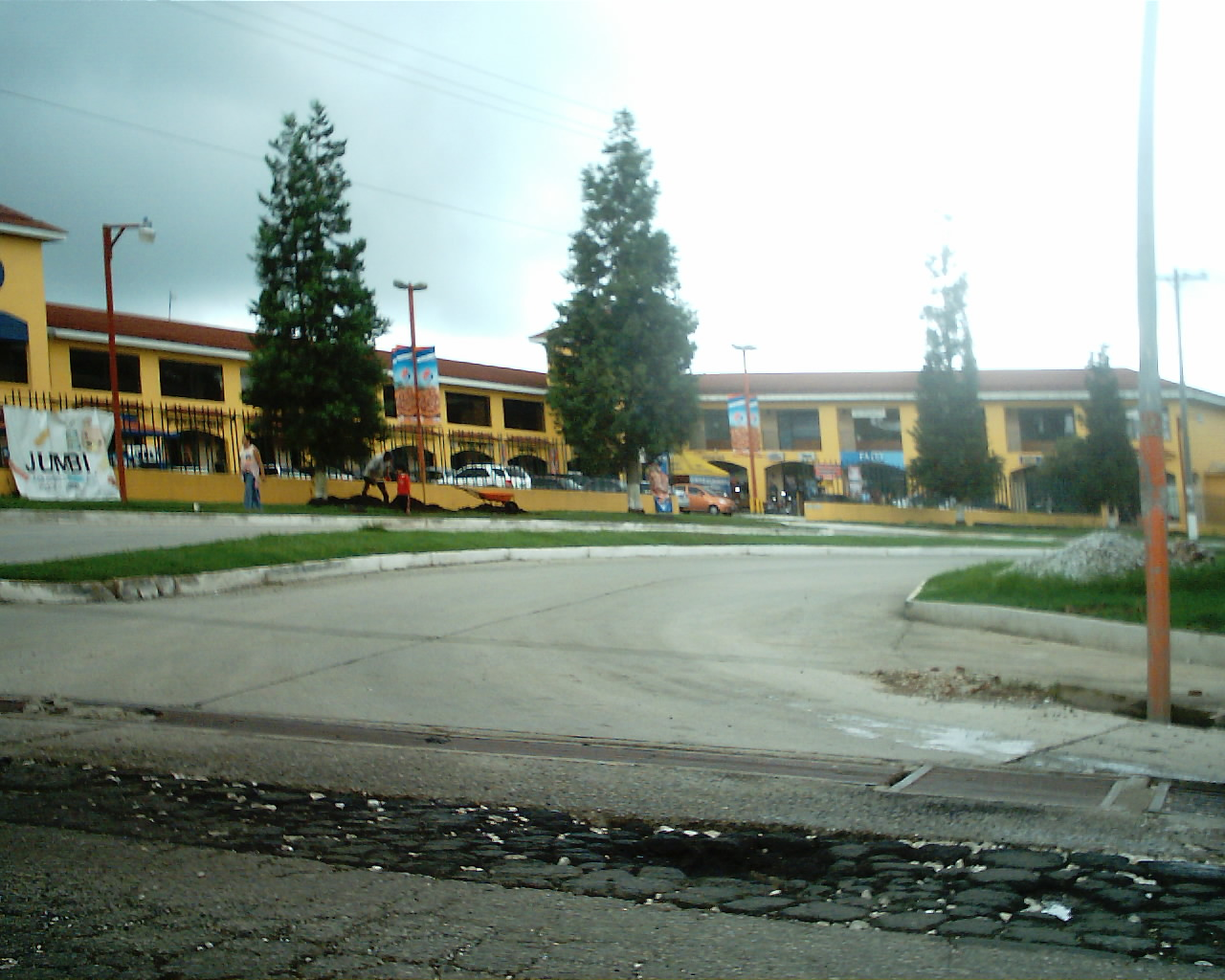
- From top, left to right: Convent in San José Pinula • Condominium located in San José Pinula • A village in San José Pinula • A church in San José Pinula • The municipal building in San José Pinula

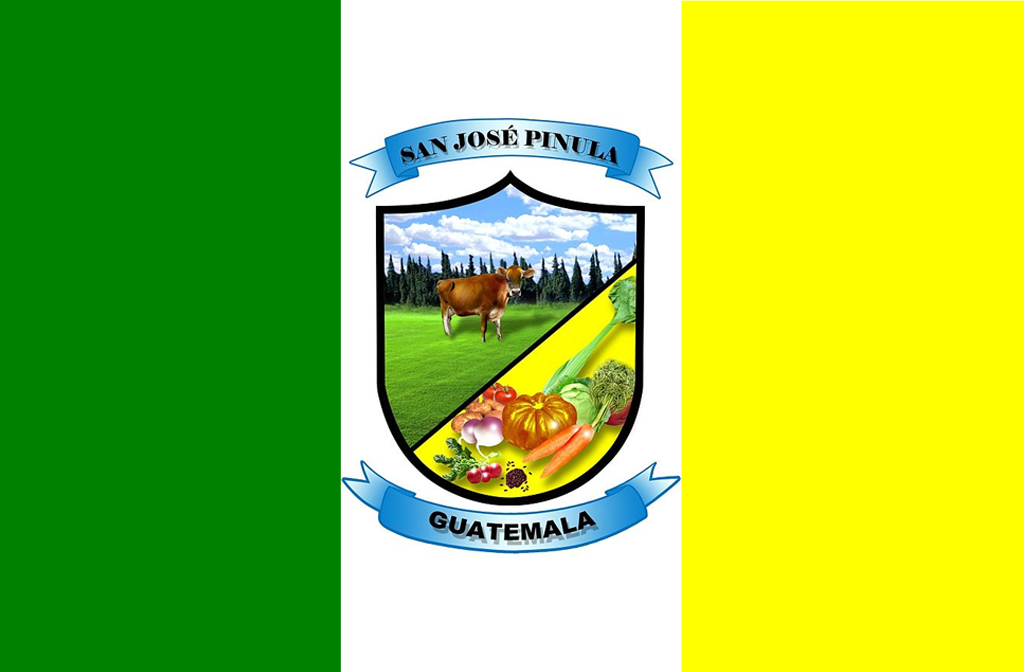
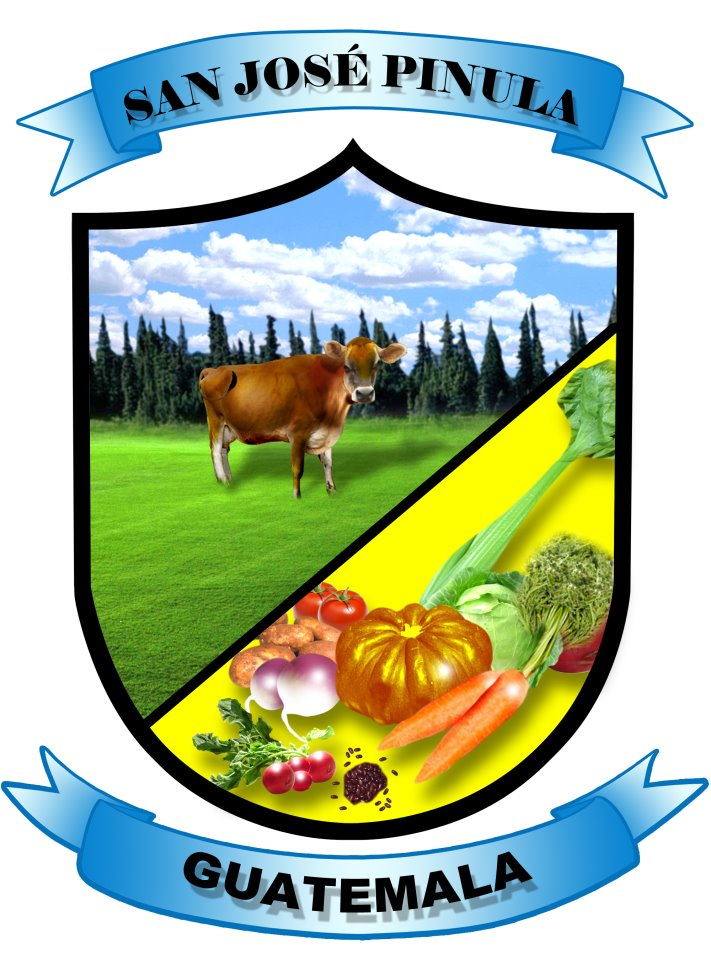
- Flag Seal

- Location in Guatemala
- Country: Guatemala
- Department: Guatemala (department)

Area
  - Total: 78 sq mi (202 km^{2})
- Elevation: 5,710 ft (1,740 m)

Population (2018 census)
  - Total: 79,844
  - Density: 1,020/sq mi (395/km^{2})
- Climate: Cwb

San José Pinula is a town, with a population of 67,327 (2018 census), and a municipality in the Department of Guatemala in the Republic of Guatemala in Central America. It is located 21 kilometers (13 mi) from the capital, Guatemala City. The city was established in 1886 as Villorio San José. The city is surrounded by mountains. Until a few years ago, the economy was based on the growing of corn, as well as some vegetables such as guisquil, chayote or pataste. However, the growth of Guatemala City in recent years has transformed farmland into suburban neighborhoods. Golf courses, such as Hacienda Nueva Country Club which used to be a convent in the 16th century and Alta Vista Country Club, both considered world-class, are now in and around San José Pinula.

The city is governed by municipal authorities elected every four years. The predominant religion in the region is Roman Catholic, followed by evangelical Protestant denominations. The patron saint and namesake of the town is San José (St. Joseph), whose day and is annually celebrated on March 19. Currently, the town of San José Pinula is coping with rapid growth which has resulted in increased traffic congestion in the mornings and evenings.

On March 8, 2017 there was a fire in a youth home filled with 500 children. There had been a riot about the conditions and about sexual abuse by the staff. 41 girls were killed.
