= Technicare =

American medical imaging equipment company

- Formerly: Ohio Nuclear
- Industry: Medical imaging, Medical devices
- Founded: October 1958
- Founder: Donald W. Steel
- Defunct: 1986
- Fate: Acquired by Johnson & Johnson; Folded in 1986
- Products: CT scanners, DR scanners, MRI machines, Nuclear medicine scanners
- Parent: Johnson & Johnson

Technicare, formerly known as Ohio Nuclear, made CT, DR and MRI scanners and other medical imaging equipment. Its headquarters was in Solon, Ohio. Originally an independent company which became publicly traded, it was later purchased by Johnson & Johnson. At the time, Invacare was also owned by Technicare. A Harvard Business Case was written about the challenges that precipitated the transition. The company did not do well under Johnson & Johnson and in 1986, under economic pressure following unrelated losses from two Tylenol product tampering cases, J&J folded the company, selling the intellectual property and profitable service business to General Electric, a competitor.

Ohio Nuclear's (ON) first products were nuclear medicine (NM) scanners. They made a rectilinear gamma scanner and a gamma camera in the 70s. This was followed by a variety of NM products. The company had bought also an ultrasound product line (formerly UNIRAD).

The following information is copied from a Technicare advertising brochure, which primarily focuses on Nuclear Medicine products. This is a personal possession and it is not known if any more of these documents survive.

1963 - Developed first whole body rectilinear scanner. 1964 - Introduced first dual head rectilinear scanner 1967 - developed scan minification principle 1968 - first to offer 750 cm/min scanning speed. 1972 - Introduced 37 tube scintillation camera 1974 - introduced large field scintillation camera to US market. 1975 - Introduced 37 tube large field mobile camera. Introduced DeltaScan, a high resolution (256 x 256) matrix whole body computed tomography scanner.

Of some additional interest is the <October, 1975, Scientific American></October, 1975, Scientific American>. On page 4 of this issue, the following statement is made (quoted verbatim from the issue).

"The Cover. The picture on the cover is a section through the chest of a living human subject made by the technique of reconstruction from projections (see "Image Reconstruction from Projections," page 56). In that technique a series of X-ray exposures made from different angles around the body are combined by computer to present a cross-sectional picture on the screen of a cathode-ray tube. In the picture on the cover the chest is seen as though it were viewed from above the patient's head. The dark spaces to the left and right are the lungs. The large red area in the middle is the heart. The white areas are bone; below the center is the spinal column, and around the lungs are sections through the ribs. In general the tomato red areas are muscular tissue and the lavender areas are fatty tissue. The branched areas in the lungs are blood vessels and bronchi. The picture was made (by the Delta Scanner built by Ohio-Nuclear, Inc.) in the course of a study that was conducted by Ralph J. Alfidi, M.D. of the Cleveland Clinic Foundation."

In CT, Technicare developed and sold the DeltaScan line of products. A prototype whole body scanner was installed in 1974 at the Cleveland Clinic. The body scanner was installed there and was introduced first. This was followed with the head only dual slice Delta 25 which competed with the EMI Mark-I, the world's first CT scanner. This followed the body scanner, Delta 50 one of the first devices to scan the whole body. Both the Delta 25 and 50 scanned the patient in 1–2 minutes which was about twice as fast as EMI products. These first units were of the first (single detector) and second (multiple detector) generation translate and rotate systems.

One of the features of this family of scanners was the elimination of the "water bag" that EMI used through the use of a beam hardening correction to produce a uniform field. Later on this led to the creation of the so-called "shaped filters" which helped to reduce dose and reduce the dynamic range of the radiation on the detectors.

One of the units at the Cleveland Clinic was used to construct an image of the body that today would be called a "Scout View", essentially a digital x-ray that was produced by moving the body through the gantry with the x-ray tube stationary. This feature was introduced by Philips in 1977 under the name "Scanogram". At the Cleveland Clinic, Dr. John Haaga, who was at the Clinic at that time, contributed to this concept.

This was followed by the DeltaScan 50FS, the Delta 100, the Delta 2000 series of products and the HPS 1440. The DeltaScan FS reduced scan time to 18 seconds. A later modification to both units allowed the speed of the units to be reduced to 1/4 of normal speed which was used for detailed head scanning. This also increased the scan time but gave the added benefit of increased resolution for cases that warranted it. The Delta 100 scanner, introduced in 1978, was an inexpensive dedicated head scanner priced to get around the certificate of need restrictions in place at the time. The Delta 2000 series, introduced in 1977, included Delta 2005, Delta 2010, Delta 2020, Delta 2060 and Delta 2060 Quantum. These scanners could scan the body in 2–5 seconds, thereby eliminating motion artifacts due to breathing. The HPS 1440 scanner was introduced in 1985 as an ultra high resolution CT scanner. These scanners were of the fourth generation design, in which there was a stationary ring of detectors and the x-ray tube rotating inside the detector ring. One of the 2020 systems was operate at Brigham and Women's Hospital attempting cardiac gated imaging.

Also in the product line were DeltaMat, a multiformat camera and DeltaPlan, a radiation therapy planning system using CT cross sectional images to plan radiation therapy treatments. These products were marketed in the 1977 to 1985 timeframe.

The DR 960 was introduced in 1982 as a digital subtraction angiography device. Rather than injecting contrast material into an artery, contrast was injected into the corresponding vein. A digital image was acquired without contrast and one with, and the images subtracted from each other leaving the arterial branch highlighted with contrast.

The company also marketed an MRI (called Nuclear Magnetic Resonance, or NMR at the time) unit, the Teslacon, beginning in 1984. Teslacon products ranged in magnetic field strength from 0.15 to 1.5 tesla. David Flugan and Robert Gauss were the chief thinkers and the 'brain trust' behind the implementation of Technicare's MRI product line. Their names ring prominent among the inventors of early MRI sub parts.

J&J continued supporting the continued development of the HPS 1440 and Teslacon II MRI systems until the end of 1987.
