= Robert Vaidlo =

Estonian journalist and children's writer

Robert Vaidlo (14 February 1921 in Tartu – 1 October 2004) was an Estonian journalist and children's writer.

== Books ==
- Lost pike (Estonian: Kadunud havi), 1954
- A seagull screams on the Eagle's Hill (Estonian: Kotkamäel karjub kajakas), 1955
- In name of friendship (Estonian: Sõpruse nimel), 1957
- Gunman Peter Poligon talks (Estonian: Suurtükiväelane Peeter Poligon pajatab), 1958
- Under striped sail (Estonian: Viirulise purje all), 1964
- Stories from the Town of Kukeleegua (Estonian: Lood Kukeleegua linnast), 1965
- Pepper mill (Estonian: Pipraveski), 1965 (for adults)
- The talking thingamajig (Estonian: Jutujulla), 1967
- The awesome marine trip of Dr. Meerike and Ponts-Ontsu (Estonian: Doktor Meerikese ja Ponts-Ontsu imepärane merereis), 1971
- Roads always lead somewhere (Estonian: Teed viivad alati kuhugi), 1975
- Kessu, 1978
- Story of a monkey (Estonian: Ühe ahvi lugu), 1988
- Ampa, 1995
- Midli-Madli tilpamised, 2002

== See also ==
- Rõmuuta
