= 2015 Guatemala landslide =

Natural disaster

- Location of the Guatemala Department in Guatemala
- Date: October 1, 2015
- Time: 9:30 p.m. (UTC−06:00)
- Location: El Cambray Dos, Santa Catarina Pinula, Guatemala Department, Guatemala; 14°34′35.3″N 90°29′45.8″W
- Cause: Landslide due to heavy rain
- Deaths: 280
- Missing: 70

On October 1, 2015, heavy rains triggered a major landslide in the village of El Cambray Dos within Santa Catarina Pinula, Guatemala—15 km (9.3 mi) east of Guatemala City, killing at least 280 people and leaving dozens unaccounted for across the village. The landslide leveled much of the village, leaving some areas under 15 m (49 ft) of earth and debris.

== Background and event ==
El Cambray Dos is a mountain village, situated at the foot of steep hills. Municipal officials had previously urged residents multiple times, starting in 2008, to move to other areas because of landslide concerns. In November 2014, the Coordinadora Nacional para la Reducción de Desastres (Conred) urged residents to "immediately" relocate to avoid future disaster. The event was preceded by several days of heavy rain, associated with the nation's annual rainy season, that caused moderate flooding, other landslides, and two deaths across the nation.

The rains saturated the steep mountains surrounding and following exacerbation from the nearby Pinula River, the mountainside gave out around 9:30 p.m. local time (UTC−06:00) on October 1. The landslide caught most residents off-guard, leaving them trapped within mud and debris. Some areas were buried under 15 m (49 ft) of earth and debris. Approximately 125 homes were damaged or destroyed; based on this, authorities estimated that 450 people were unaccounted for by the evening of October 2. This was later reduced to 350 the following day with hopes of finding more survivors diminishing. At least 131 people were confirmed dead. In addition to the fatalities, 36 people were injured.

The landslide is one of the deadliest in recent years in Guatemala. Approximately 600 people, residents and rescuers, searched through mud and debris for survivors. By October 3, 1,800 people were conducting search and rescue. Heavy machinery was brought in to clear debris. Local authorities established shelters for those rendered homeless. Residents across Guatemala donated items, such as clothes and food, to relief agencies. At least 50 tons of aid had been collected according to El Nuevo Herald. Cuba and the United States offered to provide assistance.

== See also ==
- List of landslides
- Mameyes Landslide – a similar landslide, in Puerto Rico, almost exactly 30 years before
- 2017 Guatemala orphanage fire
