= WiFi Sensing =

Wi-Fi technology

Wi-Fi Sensing (also referred to as WLAN Sensing or 802.11bf) is a technology that uses existing Wi-Fi signals for the purpose of detecting events or changes such as motion, gesture recognition, and biometric measurements (e.g. breathing). Wi-Fi Sensing allows for the utilization of conventional Wi-Fi transceiver hardware and Radio Frequency (RF) spectrum for both communication and sensing purposes.

The integration of communication and sensing functionalities within mobile networking technology constitutes a large area of exploration and is commonly referred to as Joint Communications and radar/radio Sensing (JCAS). This convergence of technologies presents an opportunity to harness pre-existing hardware and infrastructure, fostering the emergence of novel services, while facilitating a higher level of interaction with networked devices (e.g. IoT and automation).

Wi-Fi technology operates across multiple frequency bands, Broadly categorized into two groups: (a) sub-7 GHz (including 2.4 GHz, 5 GHz and 6 GHz) and (b) 60 GHz. Common Wi-Fi routers and IoT devices (including those compliant with IEEE 802.11n/ac/ax/be, or Wi-Fi 4/5/6/7) predominantly operate within the sub-7 GHz range. The widespread global adoption of these frequencies has at times resulted in pronounced network congestion, particularly in the 2.4 GHz and 5 GHz bands. Consequently, the 6 GHz band, characterized by reduced congestion and reduced latency, has been introduced. Separately, a new branch of Wi-Fi, called WiGig, operates at 60 GHz supporting higher data rates over very short distances through wider bandwidth (including IEEE 802.11ad/aj/ay). These two groups provide a unique range of possible use cases dependent on the physical electro-magnetic propagation properties, approved power levels, and allocated bandwidth resources.

The features of this technology can be broadly categorized into four domains:

- Detection (binary classification, e.g. intruder detection, fall-down detection, presence detection),
- Localization (e.g. where motion occurs)
- Recognition (multi-class classification, e.g. gesture, gait, human/pet, activity of daily living), and
- Estimation (e.g. quantity values of size, length, angle, distance, breathing rate, heart rate, people counting, etc.).

To date, detection of motion, filter of motion (i.e., pets and fans), the relative amount of motion and as well as localization have been included in commercialized Wi-Fi Sensing applications.

== Technical ==
Wi-Fi possesses a structured architecture comprising a well-defined Medium Access Control (MAC) layer, complemented by a distinct PHY layer, as specified in the 802.11 standard. Wi-Fi Sensing leverages the standard physical layer (PHY) of Wi-Fi for both sensing measurements as well as digital communication.

Since the PHY has been designed for communications, sensing operations must rely on the normal transmissions as defined by the 802.11 standard. Wi-Fi Sensing adds measurements of the orthogonal frequency-division multiplexing (OFDM) RF signals used by the PHY to detect features in the local physical environment. Using measurements like received signal strength and signal phase information among others, it is possible to detect objects in proximity to the radio. Noting how these change over time enables interpretation of changes in the environment. Development work continues on more powerful processing, higher resolution measurements in new generation radios, and new software models to enable better detection within the local environment. This improves the performance in existing use cases as well as opens new opportunities for the technology.

== History ==
Wi-Fi Sensing originated with the establishment of the Wi-Fi Sensing Work Group by the Wireless Broadband Alliance (WBA). The WBA, an industry association, focuses on promoting the widespread integration of wireless broadband and advancing converged wireless services. Key figures within the WBA, including executives and wireless technology experts, recognized the innovative potential of Wi-Fi Sensing. In response, the WBA strategically formed the Wi-Fi Sensing Work Group to raise awareness and foster industry engagement. The Wi-Fi Sensing group, acknowledging the imperative for scalability and widespread acceptance, initially conducted extensive work on the potential of Wi-Fi Sensing which involved delving into the applications, key performance indicators (KPIs), testing guidelines, and challenges associated with the technology. The culmination of these efforts formed the basis for a formal proposal that was presented to the IEEE with the aim of establishing standardized protocols for Wi-Fi Sensing.

On September 29, 2020 the IEEE Standards Association granted approval to the IEEE 802.11bf project, which focuses on Wireless Local Area Network (WLAN) Sensing standardization. The primary objective of this endeavor was the formulation of standards governing the interoperability of wireless devices compliant with the IEEE 802.11bf specifications. These standards were designed to facilitate the generation and provision of low-level (PHY and MAC) channel measurements such as channel state information (CSI). This initiative sought to enable a wide range of Wi-Fi Sensing applications. IEEE 802.11bf supports WLAN sensing across both sub-7 GHz and 60 GHz frequency bands.

== Academic ==
Much of the early academic research on wireless sensing was based on large Software-Defined-Radio (SDR) hardware, such as the Ettus Research USRP. By employing wireless signals distinct from conventional Wi-Fi, SDR technology offered the advantage of flexibility, enabling the execution of custom operations which were impossible with off-the-shelf Wi-Fi hardware due to its inherently inflexible design and implementation. The requirement of a high-end SDR made it challenging for it to be commercialized as a product. DrivenL’s subsequent efforts within the academic community shifted the focus of SDR technology predominantly back to Wi-Fi, culminating in the development of tools for extracting Channel State Information (CSI) measurements from standard 802.11n Network Interface Cards (NICs).

== Industry Associations ==
The Wireless Broadband Alliance (WBA) has taken proactive measures to foster industry awareness and comprehension of Wi-Fi Sensing by instituting a specialized workgroup dedicated to this technology domain. As part of their educational initiative, the WBA created a Wi-Fi Sensing workgroup which has released a series of white papers addressing various facets of Wi-Fi Sensing. In October 2019, The Wireless Broadband Alliance (WBA) published an industry white paper, Wi-Fi Sensing: A New Technology Emerges, providing a comprehensive analysis of existing Wi-Fi standards discerning gaps and unexplored domains that hold promise for potential enhancements. The paper explores early applications of Wi-Fi Sensing, including motion detection, gesture recognition, and biometric measurement. Moreover, it identifies potential business opportunities within the home security, health care, enterprise, and building automation/management markets. Subsequently, the WBA supplemented this foundational document with additional white papers on “Wi-Fi Sensing:Test Methodology and Performance Metrics” and “Wi-Fi Sensing: Deployment Guidelines”, extending these resources to its membership base.

The IEEE 802.11bf Task Group, operating within the broader IEEE 802.11 Working Group, is working on the standardization of Wi-Fi Sensing. Recognizing the growing importance and potential of Wi-Fi Sensing in various applications, spanning from smart homes to healthcare, the task group aims to establish a unified framework for its implementation. Their efforts revolve around defining technical specifications and protocols to ensure interoperability, reliability, and operational efficiency of Wi-Fi Sensing technologies. By setting these standards, the IEEE 802.11bf Task Group is facilitating an integrated and harmonized adoption of Wi-Fi Sensing across industries, ensuring seamless communication among devices and systems thereby maximizing the benefits of this innovative technology.

== Concerns ==
In 2026 researchers at the Karlsruhe Institute of Technology (KIT) demonstrated that standard WiFi networks using this technique can be used to identify individuals with very high accuracy, raising significant privacy and surveillance concerns. Their method exploited beamforming feedback information (BFI) which is data exchanged between WiFi devices and routers to optimise signal transmission, and then combines it with machine-learning techniques.

Critics argue that the technology effectively transforms ordinary WiFi infrastructure into a form of passive surveillance. Potential uses include tracking people's movements through public spaces, commercial venues, or other locations equipped with WiFi networks, often without their knowledge or consent. The researchers warned that such systems could be used by both private organisations and public authorities for continuous monitoring.
