= Thomas Martinetz =

German physicist and neuro-informatic (born 1962)

Thomas Martinetz (born 2 January 1962 in Nettesheim) is a German physicist and neuro-informatician.

== Life ==
Thomas Martinetz studied mathematics and physics at the Technical University of Munich, where he earned his doctorate in theoretical biophysics under Klaus Schulten in 1992 after several years as a guest at the University of Illinois at Urbana-Champaign. After working in the central research and development department of Siemens AG, in 1996 he moved to a professorship at the Institute for Neuroinformatics of the Ruhr University Bochum and took over the management of the Center for Neuroinformatics GmbH. In 1999 he accepted a call to the University of Lübeck as director of the Institute for Neuro- and Bioinformatics. From 2006 to 2008 he was Vice-Rector of the University of Lübeck, and from 2008 to 2011 Vice-President for Research and Technology Transfer. Since 2013 he is chairman of the Senate of the University of Lübeck.

His major contribution in the field of neuroinformatics is the so-called Neural gas, a variant of self-organizing maps.

He is co-founder of the software companies Consideo, the Pattern Recognition Company and gestigon.

== Awards ==
The Center for Neuroinformatics GmbH, whose management he took over in 1996, was awarded in the same year with the Innovation Award of the German economy. awarded him as a "courageous entrepreneur", and in 2011 he received the transfer award of the Innovation Foundation Schleswig-Holstein.

== Publications ==
- Thomas Martinetz and Klaus Schulten (1991). "A "neural gas" network learns topologies" (PDF). Artificial Neural Networks. Elsevier. pp. 397–402.
- Martinetz, T.M.; Berkovich, S.G.; Schulten, K.J. (1993). "'Neural-gas' network for vector quantization and its application to time-series prediction". IEEE Transactions on Neural Networks. 4 (4). Institute of Electrical and Electronics Engineers (IEEE): 558–569. doi:10.1109/72.238311. ISSN 1045-9227. PMID 18267757.
- Martinetz, Thomas; Schulten, Klaus (1994). "Topology representing networks". Neural Networks. 7 (3). Elsevier BV: 507–522. doi:10.1016/0893-6080(94)90109-0. ISSN 0893-6080.
