= Jordan Black (American football) =

American football player (born 1980)

Fort Bend Christian Eagles
- Title: Head coach

Personal information
- Born: January 28, 1980 (age 46); Garland, Texas, U.S.
- Listed height: 6 ft 5 in (1.96 m)
- Listed weight: 305 lb (138 kg)

Career information
- High school: Dallas Christian (Mesquite, Texas)
- College: Notre Dame
- NFL draft: 2003: 5th round, 153rd overall pick

Career history

Playing
- Kansas City Chiefs (2003–2006); Houston Texans (2007); Jacksonville Jaguars (2008–2010); New Orleans Saints (2011)*; Washington Redskins (2012)
- * Offseason or practice squad member only

Coaching
- Fort Bend Christian (TX) (2019–2025) Head coach; Brazos Christian School (TX) (2025-Present) Head Coach

Career NFL statistics
- Games played: 94
- Games started: 40
- Stats at Pro Football Reference

Brian Jordan Black (born January 28, 1980) is an American former professional football player who was an offensive tackle in the National Football League (NFL). He was selected by the Kansas City Chiefs in the fifth round of the 2003 NFL draft. He played college football for the Notre Dame Fighting Irish.

Black was also a member of the Houston Texans, Jacksonville Jaguars, New Orleans Saints, and Washington Redskins.

During Jordan's career in the NFL, he was elected as a Board of Player Representatives in the National Football League Players Association.

== Early life ==
Black played high school football for Dallas Christian School in Mesquite, Texas from 1995 to 1998, during which time the team won multiple Texas State championships, including a state championship playing basketball. Black's jersey, #77, was retired by Dallas Christian School in 2003.

== College career ==
Black played in 43 games for the University of Notre Dame, starting 42 of those contests. He is in the top 10 in games started at Notre Dame.

== Professional career ==
Pre-draft measurables
Height	Weight	Arm length	Hand span	40-yard dash	10-yard split	20-yard split	20-yard shuttle	Three-cone drill	Vertical jump	Broad jump
6 ft 6 in (1.98 m)	314 lb (142 kg)	33 in (0.84 m)	10 in (0.25 m)	5.19 s	1.84 s	2.97 s	4.50 s	7.65 s	30 in (0.76 m)	8 ft 10 in (2.69 m)
All values from NFL Combine.

=== Kansas City Chiefs ===
Black was selected in the 2003 NFL draft by the Kansas City Chiefs in the fifth round, with the 153rd overall pick. The Chiefs signed him to a three-year contract.

Late in the 2004 season, Black became a regular starter for the Chiefs where he continued for the 2005 and 2006 seasons.

The Chiefs re-signed him to a one-year contract on April 26, 2006.

=== Houston Texans ===
On March 8, 2007, the Houston Texans signed Black, who was a free agent, to a two-year contract.

On June 9, 2008, The Texans released Black while injured. Black had surgery on August 19, 2008, to repair the torn labrum in his right shoulder.

=== Jacksonville Jaguars ===
Black was signed by the Jacksonville Jaguars on December 23, 2008. Black accepted an extension of $3.65 million over three years on September 3, 2009. Black became a regular starter for the Jaguars in 2010. On February 7, 2011, Black was released by the Jaguars.

=== New Orleans Saints ===
On August 10, 2011, Black signed with the New Orleans Saints. He was released on September 3, 2011.

=== Washington Redskins ===
After missing a year of football in 2011, Black decided to retire from football and lose some of his playing weight. But on July 30, 2012, he unexpectedly signed with the Washington Redskins. When the Redskins signed him he was underweight for an offensive lineman, weighing 270 pounds, and had to consume 7,000 calories per day in the preseason to get into proper football form, and made the Redskins' final roster.

== Coaching career ==
Black is currently the head football coach at Brazos Christian School in Bryan, Texas, where he also serves as Dean of Students and Assistant Athletic Director. In his first season with the Eagles in 2025, he led the team to an undefeated regular season and an appearance in the TAPPS Division IV State Championship game, where they finished as state runner-up to First Baptist. Following the season, Black was named TAPPS Division IV District 2 Coach of the Year.

Previously, Black coached at Fort Bend Christian Academy in Sugar Land, Texas. He brings extensive coaching and playing experience to FBCA. In 2022 Black led the Eagles to their first Football State Championship in school history. Black took over as head coach in 2019 after the Eagles had to forfeit their 2018 season. Black spent 4 years rebuilding the program, taking the Eagles to their first playoff game in the first season he took over as head coach. Jordan has coached more than 35 players who went on to play collegiate athletics. In 2022 he was awarded Private School Coach of the Year by the Touchdown Club of Houston. In In 2026, Black was inducted into the Texas Private School Sports Hall of Fame in recognition of his lifetime achievements as both a player and a coach.

== Personal life ==
Black completed his master's of theology from Houston Baptist University in 2021. In his spare time, Black enjoys teaching and preaching at local churches and events.

Black married his high school sweetheart, Ashlie, in 2004. Together they have nine children.

== Head coaching record ==
Year	Team	Overall	Conference	Standing	Bowl/playoffs
Fort Bend Christian Eagles () (2019–present)
2019	Fort Bend Christian	5–5	2–3	4th	
2020	Fort Bend Christian	8–3	4–1	2nd	
2021	Fort Bend Christian	9–4	5–0	1st	
2022	Fort Bend Christian	10–4	4–1	2nd	
2023	Fort Bend Christian	6–6	4–1	2nd	
2024	Fort Bend Christian	8-5	5-0	1st	
Fort Bend Christian:		46-27	24-6		
Total:		46-27			
