= Zaida Luthey-Schulten =

American chemist

- Other name: Zaida Ann Luthey
- Spouse: Klaus Schulten
- Scientific career
- Fields: Chemistry; Molecular physics Computational physics Biophysics
- Workplaces: University of Illinois Urbana-Champaign
- Website: www.chemistry.illinois.edu/faculty/Zaida_Luthey_Schulten.html

External videos
- "Simulations of Ribosome Biogenesis on the Whole Cell Level", Zan Luthey-Schulten, NCSAatIllinois
- "Towards a Computational Model of a Methane Producing Archaeum", Zan Luthey-Schulten, Institute for Genomic Biology

Zaida Ann "Zan" Luthey-Schulten is the William and Janet Lycan Professor of Chemistry at the University of Illinois at Urbana-Champaign. She was promoted to professor in 2004. She is also involved with the NASA Astrobiology Institute.

Luthey-Schulten develops molecular dynamics simulations, focusing on individual molecules and groups of molecules and the cellular processes occurring within them. Models are verified and improved through comparison to experimental data from independent researchers. In 2011, her group simulated the cellular architecture of an entire cell and its surrounding cytoplasm, the first time that such an extensive and complex cellular system had been modeled. The three-dimensional model combined ribosome data and other descriptors of Escherichia coli. Representing the architectural features of the interior of the cell suggested that crowding might significantly affect reactions that occur within the cells. More recent work has focused on the modelling of a methane-producing archaean.

== Education ==
Luthey-Schulten attended the University of Southern California, receiving a B.S. in chemistry in 1969. She then went to Harvard University, from which she was received an M.S. in chemistry in 1972, and a Ph.D. in applied mathematics in 1975. Her advisors were Donald G. M. Anderson and Roy G. Gordon. She worked as a research fellow at the Max Planck Institute for Biophysical Chemistry in Göttingen, Germany, from 1975 to 1980, and at the department of theoretical physics at the Technical University of Munich from 1980 to 1985.

== Honors and awards ==
Luthey-Schulten is a fellow of the American Physical Society and a fellow of the Advanced Study Institute at Hebrew University of Jerusalem. In 2018, she delivered the Francis D. Carlson Lecture in the Department of Biophysics at Johns Hopkins University. In 2019 was named the Murchison-Mallory Endowed Chair in Chemistry In 2025 the Biophysical Society created a new award called the Klaus Schulten and Zaida Luthey-Schulten Computational Biophysics Lecture Award to honor outstanding research in the field.
