= Dallas Christian School =

Location
- 1515 Republic Parkway; Mesquite, Texas 75150; United States; 32.831290°N 96.625984°W

Information
- Type: Private, Church of Christ
- Motto: Character, Citizenship, Christ
- Established: 1957
- Faculty: 70
- Enrollment: 735 coed students (K-12)
- Campus: Suburban, 60 acres
- Colors: Blue, black, and white
- Mascot: Chargers
- Athletics: Men's and Women's sports
- Website: www.dallaschristian.com

Dallas Christian School is a private, preparatory Christian day school for boys and girls located in Mesquite, Texas. The school offers classes for students ranging from pre-kindergarten through the twelfth grade. Dallas Christian School is a member of the Texas Association of Private and Parochial Schools (TAPPS).

In 2004, the school was the recipient of the No Child Left Behind Blue Ribbon Award from the United States Department of Education, which placed Dallas Christian as one of only four private schools in the state of Texas and one of only 50 private schools nationally to receive the award. Dallas Christian School has special programs such as its LEAP and Scholars Lab programs, which focus on helping students with developmental needs.

The school maintains an affiliation with the Church of Christ, a community of Christians who aim to restore and emulate Christianity as practiced by the first-century church according to Scripture of the New Testament.

== School History ==
Dallas Christian was founded in 1957 in various church buildings in the Dallas area and only served students in K5 and first grade. In 1965, the school had come to include several campuses which graduated elementary students into middle school at the new Pleasant Grove campus. Growth in the early 1970s allowed the school to move to its current location, the former site of the Christian College of the Southwest.

== Academic Services ==
S.C.H.O.L.A.R.S. LAB (Students Can Have Organizational, Learning, And Reading Strategies) is offered for all students K5-12th grade. This program helps students who have mild learning disabilities to establish habits that will help them in the classroom. All students accepted into the program must have documentation of a diagnosed learning disability.

Dallas Christian helps students prepare for college and excel in academics in a Christ center environment

Dallas Christian School uses the Arrowsmith Program.

Dallas Christian School offers classes through Eastfield college

== College acceptance ==
Over the past decade, Dallas Christian alumni have attended schools such as The University of Alabama, United States Air Force Academy, Cornell University, University of California, Berkeley, Dartmouth College, Colorado State University, New York University, Georgetown University, Furman University, The University of Texas at Austin, Southern Methodist University, Austin College, Trinity University, Baylor University, Texas Christian University, Texas A&M University, Abilene Christian University, Lubbock Christian University, Texas Tech University, Embry–Riddle Aeronautical University and North Texas. Dallas Christian has also helped a number of its students achieve recognition as National Merit Scholarship recipients.

== Athletics ==
Dallas Christian has a long history of success in a variety of sports. In men's athletics, the football, baseball, and golf programs have won multiple consecutive state championships. The women's athletics program has the most recent run of state championships for Dallas Christian, with the women's basketball team earning back-to-back state titles in 2016 and 2017.

Dallas Christian State Championships:

Baseball: 1984, 1996, 1997, 1998, 1999, 2000, 2001, 2007,2019

Football: 1985, 1986, 1987, 1989, 1995, 1997, 1998, 2008, 2021, 2022, 2023, 2024

Men's Basketball: 1996

Women's Basketball: 2016, 2017, 2022, 2023

Men's Golf: 1983, 1984, 1985, 1986, 1997

Women's Golf: 2004

Women's Tennis: 2005

Volleyball: 1981, 1986, 1997

Women's Track: 2006

Men's Track: 2009

== Notable alumni ==
- Jordan Black, professional football player. Drafted by the National Football League's Kansas City Chiefs. Played professionally for the Houston Texans and Jacksonville Jaguars.
- Bonnie Curtis, Hollywood Movie Producer.
- Skye Dawson, professional football player. Alumni of Texas Christian University. Drafted by the National Football League's Washington Redskins. Currently playing wide receiver for the Tampa Bay Buccaneers.
- Choo Freeman, professional baseball player. Played professional baseball for the Los Angeles Dodgers and Colorado Rockies organizations.
- Parker Robertson, professional football player. Alumni of Oklahoma State University. Undrafted by the National Football League's Denver Broncos.

== See also ==
- Texas Association of Private and Parochial Schools
