= Parker Robertson =

American football player (born 2002)

Profile
- Position: Safety

Personal information
- Born: April 22, 2002 (age 24)
- Listed height: 5 ft 11 in (1.80 m)
- Listed weight: 185 lb (84 kg)

Career information
- High school: Dallas Christian (Mesquite, Texas)
- College: Oklahoma State (2021–2025)
- NFL draft: 2026: undrafted

Career history
- Denver Broncos (2026)*
- * Offseason or practice squad member only

Parker Robertson (born April 22, 2002) is an American professional football safety. He played college football for the Oklahoma State Cowboys. Robertson was signed by the Denver Broncos as an undrafted free agent in 2026.

== Early life ==
Robertson attended Dallas Christian School in Mesquite, Texas. Coming out of high school, he committed to play college football for the Oklahoma State Cowboys, joining the team as a walk-on.

== College career ==
As a freshman in 2021, Robertson was redshirted. In 2022, he appeared in 12 games, mainly on special teams, where he recovered a muffed punt. In 2023, Robertson notched 13 tackles, a forced fumble, and a fumble recovery in 14 games. In the 2024 season, he played in all 12 games with two starts, totaling 49 tackles and two interceptions. In week 12 of the 2025 season, Robertson tallied eight tackles, a sack, two pass deflections, and an interception in a loss to Kansas State. He finished the 2025 season with 77 tackles with eight and a half being for a loss, a sack, five pass deflections, two interceptions, and two forced fumbles.

== Professional career ==
Pre-draft measurables
Height	Weight	Arm length	Hand span	Wingspan	40-yard dash	10-yard split	20-yard split	20-yard shuttle	Three-cone drill	Vertical jump	Broad jump	Bench press
5 ft 10 1/2 in (1.79 m)	193 lb (88 kg)	29 3/8 in (0.75 m)	9 in (0.23 m)	5 ft 9 7/8 in (1.77 m)	4.53 s	1.63 s	2.66 s	4.46 s	7.20 s	35.0 in (0.89 m)	9 ft 10 in (3.00 m)	17 reps
All values from Pro Day

After not being selected in the 2026 NFL draft, Robertson signed with the Denver Broncos as an undrafted free agent. On August 30, 2026, he was waived by the Broncos as a part of final roster cuts.

== Personal life ==
Robertson is the younger brother of former Oklahoma State football captain, Chase Robertson.
