= USens =

American startup company

uSens
- Type: Private
- Industry: Human-computer interaction, human machine interface, computer vision, artificial intelligence
- Founded: 2014
- Headquarters: San Jose, California, United States
- Key people: Anli He (CEO & Founder); Yue Fei (CTO & Founder)
- Products: Gesture recognition technology HCI technology
- Website: usens.com

uSens, Inc. is a Silicon Valley startup founded in 2014 in San Jose, California. The company builds interactive computer-vision tracking solutions. The uSens team works in artificial intelligence (AI), computer vision, 3D human-computer interaction (HCI) technology and augmented reality and virtual reality. uSens has been applying computer vision and AI technologies in AR/VR, automotives, and smartphones.

uSens has its corporate headquarters in San Jose, California, with additional offices in Beijing, Hangzhou, and Shenzhen.

== History ==
The co-founder of uSens, Yue Fei, is a researcher in the field of 3D user interfaces and virtual reality. He earned his PhD from Rice University in Space Physics.

uSens has developed products in the area of HCI, such as the Fingo Virtual Touch, which is sold in China. Fingo Virtual Touch uses the company's Fingo technology, which allows a user to interact with a digital interface like a smart TV without the need to touch any surface. It consists of a small sensor and a set of software algorithms that automatically “sense” and translate hand gestures into movements onscreen.

In March 2015, the company launched a Kickstarter campaign to fund a VR/AR hardware product, reaching its initial funding goal within a few days. In February 2017, uSens announced that it would refund all Kickstarter backers.

uSens announced a $20 million Series A funding round in June 2016 led by Fosun Kinzon Capital. Additional participants included returning investor Maison Capital, as well as new investors Great Capital, Fortune Capital, Oriental Fortune Capital, iResearch Capital, Chord Capital, and ARM Innovation Ecosystem Accelerator. The company previously received a pre-Series A investment of $5.5 million co-led by IDG Ventures, Lebox Capital and Maison Capital.

== See also ==
- Gesture recognition
- Motion capture
