= Klaus Schulten =

German-American computational biophysicist

- Born: January 12, 1947; Recklinghausen, Germany
- Died: October 31, 2016 (aged 69); Urbana, Illinois, U.S.
- Education: Harvard University
- Known for: Molecular dynamics, Photosynthesis, High performance computing, Molecular graphics
- Spouse: Zaida Luthey-Schulten
- Awards: Biophysical Society National Lecturer, Sidney Fernbach Award
- Scientific career
- Fields: Physics, Chemistry, Biophysics, Computational biology
- Workplaces: University of Illinois at Urbana Champaign
- Doctoral advisor: Martin Karplus
- Doctoral students: Axel Brunger; Thomas Martinetz
- Website: http://www.ks.uiuc.edu/~kschulte

External videos
- "Klaus Schulten, The Computational Microscope", TEDxUIUC
- "Interview Klaus Schulten, 2015 National Lecturer, Biophysical Society

Klaus Schulten (January 12, 1947 – October 31, 2016) was a German-American computational biophysicist and the Swanlund Professor of Physics at the University of Illinois at Urbana-Champaign. Schulten used supercomputing techniques to apply theoretical physics to the fields of biomedicine and bioengineering and dynamically model living systems. His mathematical, theoretical, and technological innovations led to key discoveries about the motion of biological cells, sensory processes in vision, animal navigation, light energy harvesting in photosynthesis, and learning in neural networks.

Schulten identified the goal of the life sciences as being to characterize biological systems from the atomic to the cellular level. He used petascale computers, and planned to use exa-scale computers, to model atomic-scale bio-chemical processes. His work made possible the dynamic simulation of the activities of thousands of proteins working together at the macromolecular level. His research group developed and distributed software for computational structural biology, which Schulten used to make a number of significant discoveries. The molecular dynamics package NAMD and the visualization software VMD are estimated to be used by at least 300,000 researchers worldwide. Schulten died in 2016 following an illness.

== Education ==
Schulten received a Diplom degree from the University of Münster in 1969 and a PhD in chemical physics from Harvard University in 1974, advised by Martin Karplus. At Harvard Schulten studied vision, and the ways in which biomolecules respond to photoexcitation. He was particularly interested in studying retinal, a polyene and a chromophore of opsins. Schulten was able to provide a theoretical explanation for experimental observations of an "optically forbidden" state which did not match predicted patterns of electronic excitation in polyenes. Schulten classified electrons into covalent and non-covalent states, and determined that electrons that acted in a coordinated (covalent) manner used less energy than those which were independent (non-covalent).

== Career and Research ==
=== Max Planck Institute for Biophysical Chemistry ===
After graduating, Schulten joined the Max Planck Institute for Biophysical Chemistry in Göttingen, where he remained till 1980. At the institute, he worked with Albert Weller on electron transfer reactions. One of his first projects was to explain a chemical reaction product called a "fast triplet", an excited molecule with a pair of electrons with parallel spins. What Schulten discovered was that a magnetic field could provably influence a chemical reaction, a physical effect that had not previously been demonstrated. It was possible to show the effect by causing the reaction to occur with and without a magnetic field. Schulten was particularly interested in implications of the magnetic field effect for biological systems such as electron transfer in photosynthesis.

Schulten also began to explore the possibility that fast triplets could explain compass sensors in biological species such as migrating birds. That the European robin used some form of magnetoreception was demonstrated by Wolfgang Wiltschko and Fritz Merkel in 1965, and further studied by Wolfgang and Roswitha Wiltschko. Schulten proposed that quantum entanglement of a radical-pair system could underlie a biochemical compass. Schulten and others have since extended this early work, developing a model of the possible excitation of cryptochrome proteins in photoreceptors within the retina of the eye.

=== Technical University of Munich ===
In 1980, Schulten became a professor of theoretical physics at the Technical University of Munich. In 1988, Hartmut Michel, Johann Deisenhofer, and Robert Huber won the Nobel Prize in chemistry for determining the three-dimensional structure of the photosynthetic reaction center. Their elucidation of the reaction center's structure made it feasible for Klaus Schulten to develop simulations models of photosynthesis. Schulten later worked with Michel and Deisenhofer on models of LH2 in photosynthesis.

Schulten recognized that a successful attack on modeling the photosynthetic reaction center would require parallel computing power. He used his research grants to support Munich students Helmut Grubmüller and Helmut Heller in building a custom parallel computer optimized for molecular dynamics simulations. They developed a parallel computer, the T60, containing ten circuit boards with six Transputers each, for a total of 60 nodes. The T60 was small enough that Schulten was able to carry it through customs in a backpack, when he moved to the United States to join the University of Illinois at Urbana-Champaign. The T60's parallel computing software, which the students named EGO, was written in OCCAM II.

=== University of Illinois at Urbana-Champaign ===
In 1988, Schulten moved to the University of Illinois at Urbana-Champaign (UIUC), where he founded the Theoretical and Computational Biophysics Group at the Beckman Institute for Advanced Science and Technology in 1989.

The early development of NAMD at UIUC built on the work of Schulten's students in Munich to build a custom parallel computer optimized for molecular dynamics simulations. The first simulation on the T60 modeled 27,000 atoms of membrane structure, and took twenty months to run. The simulation results agreed with experimental results, and were eventually published in the Journal of Physical Chemistry.

Work on the T60 and the Connection Machine convinced Schulten that more computing power and expertise were needed. Schulten partnered with computer scientists Robert Skeel, and Laxmikant V. Kale ("Sanjay" Kale) on a five-year grant from the NIH, and their students began writing molecular dynamics code in a new language, C++. Since then, Schulten's research group has become well known for the development of software for computational structural biology, including the molecular dynamics package NAMD and the visualization software VMD. The packages are freely usable for non-commercial research, and are used by approximately 300,000 researchers world-wide.

If we want to understand health and disease, we need to understand life at the molecular level and to know how all the molecular components work together like clockwork.

Over time, Schulten targeted biological structures of increasing size and complexity, with larger and larger computers. By 2007 he was exploring molecular modeling using graphical processing units (GPUs). Validation of models against experimental results is an integral part of development, for example, using molecular dynamics in combination with cryo-electron microscopy and X-ray crystallography. to study the structures of large macromolecular complexes.

1996 marked the publication of Schulten's model of the LH2 structure of the photosynthetic reaction centre protein family of Rhodospirillum molischianum. Drawing upon Richard J. Cogdell's structure of nine-folded LH-2 from Rhodopseudomonas acidophila, Schulten worked with Michel to develop an eight-folded crystal structure model of LH2 in R. molischianum. In addition to its spectroscopic properties, they examined its energy transfer reactions in photosynthetic light-harvesting.

In 2006, Schulten's group modeled the satellite tobacco mosaic virus, emulating femtosecond interactions of approximately one million atoms in the virus and a surrounding drop of salt water for 50 billionths of a second. It was the first time that such a complete model had been generated, requiring the resources of the National Center for Supercomputing Applications at Urbana. The simulation provided new insights about activities of the virus. One discovery was that the virus, which looks symmetrical in still images, actually pulses in and out asymmetrically. Another was that the virus coat, the protein capsid, is dependent upon the genetic material in the RNA core of the particle and will collapse without it. This suggests that the genetic material must already be present before the virus can build its coat when reproducing. Such research points to possible interventions that may help to control the virus, and also offers the possibility of exploring possible interventions in silico to predict effectiveness.

A 2009 review describes work in modeling and verifying simulations of proteins such as titin, fibrinogen, ankyrin, and cadherin using the group's "computational microscope".

In 2010, Schulten's group at Illinois and researchers at the University of Utah published research examining the development of drug resistance to Tamiflu in H1N1pdm swine influenza and H5N1 avian influenza virus. Their simulations suggested that drug resistance may arise from disruption of the binding process due to electrostatic attraction in charged neuraminidase pathways, in addition to disruption of Tamiflu's pentyl sidegroup.

In 2013, Schulten's group published a simulated structure of the human immunodeficiency virus capsid containing 64 million atoms, among the largest simulations reported, produced using the supercomputer Blue Waters.

As of 2015, the largest reported simulations involved a hundred million atoms. Schulten's team modeled the structure and function of a Purple bacteria's chromatophore, one of the simplest living examples of photosynthesis. Modeling the processes involved in converting sunlight into chemical energy meant representing 100 million atoms, 16,000 lipids, and 101 proteins, the contents of a tiny sphere-shaped organelle occupying just one percent of the cell's total volume. The team used the Titan supercomputer at the Oak Ridge National Laboratory in Tennessee. At his death Schulten was already planning simulations for the exa-scale Summit computer, expected to be built by 2018.

== Honors, awards and memberships ==
Schulten was a Fellow of the Biophysical Society (2012) and of the American Physical Society (1992). He received the Sidney Fernbach Award (with Laxmikant V. Kale) from the IEEE Computer Society in 2012. He received the Biophysical Society Distinguished Service Award for 2013, for "laying the groundwork for the realistic molecular dynamic simulations of biological macromolecules on time scales that match the physiological realm, and for making the methods and software openly available." He was the Biophysical Society National Lecturer in 2015, the highest form of recognition given by the society. In 2025 the Biophysical Society created a new award called the Klaus Schulten and Zaida Luthey-Schulten Computational Biophysics Lecture Award to honor outstanding research in the field.
