= Fort Bend Christian Academy =

Location
- Sugar Land, Texas; United States; 29.6301°N 95.6152°W

Information
- Former names: Sugar Creek Baptist Church School (SCBCS); Fort Bend Baptist Academy (FBBA)
- Type: Private, co-educational, non-profit
- Motto: believe. achieve. lead.
- Denomination: non-denominational Christian
- Opened: September 1987
- Head of school: Rene' Cargile
- Grades: PK-12
- Gender: Co-educational
- Enrollment: 860
- Student to teacher ratio: 10:1
- Colors: Green; White; Gold
- Athletics conference: TAPPS 5A
- Mascot: Eagles
- Nickname: FBCA
- Rivals: Lutheran South Academy
- Accreditation: Southern Association of Independent Schools (SAIS) Southern Association of Colleges and Schools (SACS)
- Website: Fort Bend Christian Academy

Fort Bend Christian Academy (FBCA) is a private PK-12 Christian school with two campuses in Sugar Land, Texas in the Houston metropolitan area. With two campuses, the North Campus houses upper school (9th - 12th Grade) while the South Campus houses lower school (PreK - 4th Grade) and middle school (5th - 8th Grade). FBCA pursues a mission "to equip students to thrive spiritually, academically, socially, emotionally, and physically" through weekly chapel, maintaining a 10:1 student-to-teacher ratio in the upper school and providing a wide variety of honors and AP courses. With 82% of students participating in athletics, FBCA has high participation in their sports program alongside a competitive Fine Arts program the school has achieved a combined 26 Fine Arts and Athletic State Championships. The school has unique traditions and opportunities such as Eagle Week and has been recognized as the "Best Private School" in Fort Bend County.

Rene Cargile was announced as Interim Head of School in June 2024 for the 2024-2025 school year.

Steven Novotny, a graduate of Liberty University, was announced as the new Head of School for the new 2025-2026 school year after “an extensive nationwide search.”

FBCA is currently seeking a new Head of School for the 2026-2027 school year.

== Academics ==
=== Upper School ===
All Upper School FBCA students graduate from either the recommended or distinguished degree program, with 100% of graduates pursuing post-secondary education or military service. The average class size in FBCA's Upper School is 14 students. Course offerings include a variety of unique honors and Advanced Placement-level courses. Drawing on the diverse community of the surrounding area, the Upper School boasts 40% racial diversity.

FBCA alumni have included National Merit Finalists, Semifinalists and Commended Scholars and have gone on to study at The University of Texas at Austin, Texas A&M University, Baylor University, Rice University and the University of California, Berkeley.

=== Lower and Middle School ===
Serving as a foundation for a college-preparatory education, the Lower School curriculum combines a "traditional academic program rich in mathematics, science, literature and social studies with a diverse offering of courses in Spanish, computers, music, art, science and physical education."

In 2020, a STEAM Lab was opened for the Lower and Middle School focused on Science, Technology, Engineering, Art, and Mathematics. Students engage in STEAM enrichment classes beginning in PreK, developing skills to code and program robots, learn about science fundamentals such as states of matter, and work on engineering projects designed to teach and engage students on fundamental engineering and physics principles.

In Middle School, "the traditional academic program offers a rich selection of classes within arts, world languages, technology, creative writing and leadership opportunities. Students participate in weekly chapel and dive deeper into daily Bible classes" designed to develop servant leaders.

Students from the Lower and Middle Schools have a variety of opportunities to compete in various academic competitions including the Private School Interscholastic Association (PSIA) state competition.

== Athletics ==
Fort Bend Christian Academy sports teams are known as the Eagles; their colors are green and white with gold accent. They compete as a TAPPS Division II/5A school with 26 varsity and junior varsity upper school athletics teams. Multiple sports are offered in each sports season, including cheerleading, dance team, cross country, football, and volleyball in the fall; basketball, cheerleading, dance team, soccer, and swimming in the winter; and baseball, golf, softball, tennis, track and field in the spring.

Recently named "Best Private School" in Fort Bend County, FBCA offers students opportunities to play multiple sports at a competitive level with a substantial 82% of students participating in competitive sports annually and half of all Middle and Upper School students participating in the Performing Arts. The objective of the FBCA athletic department is to "glorify God while developing student athletes and mentoring them in blending a competitive spirit in the athletic arena while attaining excellence in their spiritual lives, academic endeavors, and social responsibilities."

On February 11, 2019, FBCA named world-record setter Deon Minor Head Track and Field coach.

On June 19, 2024, Richard Lazarou was named as Fort Bend Christian Academy's Director of Athletics and brings significant experience in coaching and managing and mentoring coaches and has been awarded numerous other awards including a "Touchdown Club Award, Positive Coaching Alliance Double Gold Coach Award, Fort Bend Playbook Coach of the Year, Texas A&M Inspiration Award for Exceptional Secondary Education, Austin High School."

On April 14, 2025, FBCA named Ben Hoffmeier as head football coach. Coach Hoffmeier holds a Bachelor of Arts in Religion from Centre College and a Master of Arts in Theological Studies from Trinity International University before going on to lead Brazos Christian School to three consecutive state quarterfinals and in 2016 was honored in Dave Campbell's Texas Football "40 Under 40" as part of the TAPPS state championship coaching staff.

On June 24, 2025, Coach Edwin Maysonet was announced as Head Baseball coach, bringing 10+ years of professional playing experience in the MLB.

=== Notable athletic achievements ===
With a combined 26 fine art and athletic state championships, FBCA has won numerous athletic awards including most recently:

- 2024 and 2025 TAPPs 5A State Championship in Golf
- 2025 TAPPS 5A State Championship in boys' track team and State Championship runner-up for girl's track team with Bayleigh Minor named Athleet of the Meet
- 2022 TAPPS 5A State Championship in Football overcoming Second Baptist 41-14
- 2022 and 2023 TAPPS 5A State Championship for the girls' track team.
- 2023 TAPPS 5A State Championship for the boys' track team
- 2022 TAPPS 5A State Runner Up for girls' volleyball team
- 2021 TAPPS 5A State Championship for the girls' volleyball team
- 2021 TAPPS 5A State Regional Finalist for boys' baseball team
- 2021 TAPPS 5A State Runner Up for boys' track team
- 2019, 2005, 2002, & 1998 TAPPS 5A State Final Four for boys' basketball
- 2019 TAPPS 5A State Championship for girls' tennis
- 2019 TAPPS 5A State Championship for cheerleading
- Seven TAPPS State Championships in girls' softball
- Multiple TAPPS 5A State records in boys' and girls' swimming

== Fine Arts ==
Fort Bend Christian Academy offers a fine arts program for students across different grade levels, starting from lower school enrichment classes in music and art, which gradually expand to include band and theatre opportunities during middle school.

At the upper school level, the visual arts program provides a diverse range of courses in the visual and performing arts and media. With a selection of more than 20 Honors and AP-level art options, students have opportunities to explore and develop their artistic interests. In 2024, a Stagecraft class was added to the course catalogue to explore the terminologies and techniques used in technical theatre—offering hands-on stagecraft experience.

In the performing arts, students have the opportunity to perform in multiple school plays and musicals per year including student-directed musicals in the advanced Production Theatre class. Past performances have included Hadestown: Teen Edition, Once on This Island JR, Godspell JR, Beauty and the Beast, The Addams Family, Matilda, Newsies, West Side Story, The Lion King JR, and The Sound of Music. Additionally, middle school and upper school praise teams lead weekly chapel/worship every Wednesday morning. Furthermore, the FBCA Theatre and ASL departments have worked together on a number of plays and musicals in order to present performances for the hearing-impaired community including Once on This Island JR, The Taste of Sunrise and Godspell JR.

Throughout the academic year, students actively participate in TAPPS competitions and various performances, showcasing their talents and skills acquired through the fine arts program. This participation allows students to further enrich their artistic growth and gain valuable experiences in a competitive and collaborative setting.

=== Notable Fine Arts Achievements ===
FBCA has built a strong visual arts program with 10 TAPPS State Championships in the visual arts including a wide variety of visual art mediums including drawing - black & white & color, communication design, computer rendered art, painting, printmaking, 2D mixed media, photography black & white & color, sculpture, 2D relief, fashion design, textile arts, applied/industrial design, pottery, ceramics, senior portfolio, art history, on-site drawing seek and sketch - black and white & color, and short film (narrative, documentary, animation).

==== Notable Visual Arts Achievements ====
- 2024 1st Place - TAPPS 2024 State Art Champions 5A
- 2023 1st Place - TAPPS 2023 State Art Champions 5A
- 2023 Houston Livestock Show & Rodeo Art Competition recognizes 25 FBCA Students
- 2022 1st Place - TAPPS 2022 State Art Champions 5A
- 2021 3rd Place - TAPPS 2021 State Art Online - 3rd Place 5A
- 2020 Senior Portfolio Students placed 2nd, 3rd, 4th, 6th, 7th (COVID - TAPPS was canceled)
- 2019 1st Place - TAPPS 2019 State Art Champions 5A
- 2018 1st Place - TAPPS 2018 State Art Champions 5A
- 2018 Senior Portfolio Students placed 1st, 2nd, 3rd, 4th, 6th, and 8th
- 2017 1st Place - TAPPS 2017 State Art Champions 5A
- 2016 2nd Place - TAPPS 2016 Art State Art Runners Up 4A
- 2015 1st Place - TAPPS 2015 State Art Champions 4A
- 2014 1st Place - TAPPS 2014 State Art Champions 4A
- 2013 1st Place - TAPPS 2013 State Art Champions 4A
- 2012 1st Place - TAPPS 2012 State Art Champions 4A
- 2011 1st Place - TAPPS 2011 State Art Champions 4A
- 2010 2nd Place - TAPPS 2010 Art State Art Runners Up 4A

==== Notable Other Arts Achievements ====
- 2017 TAPPS 1st Place - Ready Writing State 5A

== Foreign language ==
Foreign language courses include Spanish I-IV and ASL I-V. FBCA has a robust American Sign Language (ASL) program that enriches the community through student performances, works with the theatre department to incorporate ASL into musicals, and incorporates machine translation of sign languages using SignAll technology to allow students to "practice, learn, and get immediate feedback on their American Sign Language skills in real time."

== Traditions ==
FBCA encourages a variety of traditions to "encourage participation, build community and provide families with fond memories of their time spent on campus." These traditions range from more common activities such as Homecoming and Rodeo Day to opportunities for building community such as:

- Eighth Grade Camp Eagle week which is included in the cost of tuition and offers students an opportunity to "experience outdoor adventure and grow closer to Christ and each other during a week-long retreat at Camp Eagle in the Texas Hill Country" with activities ranging from zip lining, swimming, and sports to rock climbing, kayaking and more. They also take part in worship and devotional times.
- Eagle Week is a unique opportunity for FBCA upper school students "to serve locally or internationally and to meet the physical and spiritual needs of people living thousands of miles away or just down the road." Whether serving at a Food bank, clothing bank, visiting Washington, D.C. to learn about our country's history, helping with local kids ministries, hosting Vacation Bible schools, or traveling to international destinations such as Greece, Israel, The Bahamas, Haiti, Ukraine, or Spain — students are afforded a variety of opportunities to build stronger ties with communities.
- Senior-Kinder buddy program which is a leadership program designed to foster strong community bonds, connecting FBCA students just beginning their time at the school with those about to finish. "Students meet with their buddies on several occasions throughout the year including a book reading pajama party, 50's style sock hop to celebrate the 50th day of school and a 100th day of school celebration where they dress as the elderly."

== History ==
Campuses in Sugar Land

The school first opened in September 1987, with seven kindergarten students, as Sugar Creek Baptist Church School (SCBCS). The school, on the property of Sugar Creek Baptist Church, had one teacher in its initial year, and 1988 it had 14 students with first grade included. The school moved to the property of the First Baptist Church of Sugar Land and changed its name to Fort Bend Baptist Academy (FBBA) in Summer 1992. At the time of the move the school became non-denominational and it was no longer affiliated and no longer received support from the church. The word "Baptist" remained in its name even though it became a non-denominational school with no support from any particular denomination.

The 7th and 8th grades opened in the 1993–1994 school year. In the following year the FBBA's high school division opened.

Its current name (Fort Bend Christian Academy) was adopted in the summer of 2011. The board adopted a name indicating the school's non-denominational status in order to compete with area private schools and increase enrollment. The school mascot, colors, and scripture verse remained the same. The school hired a marketing company to establish a new brand along with the new name.

== Campus and location ==
FBCA facilities are adjacent to one another across the large 35-acre campus with multiple facilities including the South Campus, North Campus, 7,000 sq. ft. Visual Arts Pavilion, baseball stadium, athletic complex, field house, track, soccer field, weight room, training facility, and football field with new shock pad system, cooler infill, and artificial turf surface.

The campus consists of three main facilities:

- North Campus for Upper School/High School students (9th - 12th Grade)
- South Campus for Lower/Middle School students (PreK - 8th Grade)
- Athletics Complex

=== North Campus (Upper School) ===
1250 Seventh Street

Sugar Land, TX 77478

=== South Campus (Lower/Middle School) ===
1201 Lakeview Drive

Sugar Land, TX 77478

=== Athletic Complex ===
1207 Seventh Street

Sugar Land, TX 77478
