= Gestigon =

Software development company

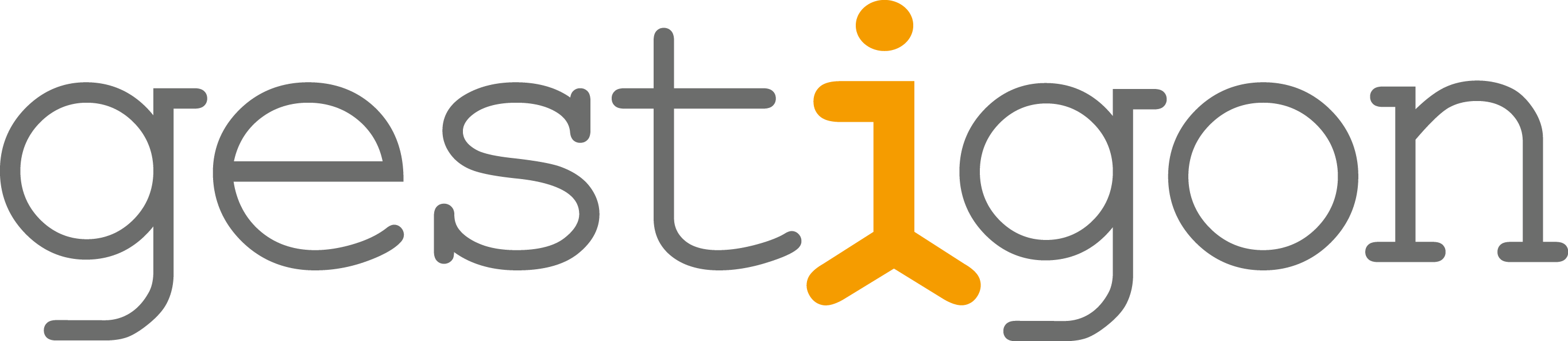
- Industry: Automotive, consumer electronics, virtual reality, augmented reality, smart home technology and IoT
- Founded: September 2011
- Founder: Sascha Klement, CTO; Moritz von Grotthuss, CEO (late founder); Erhardt Barth; Thomas Martinetz
- Headquarters: Lübeck, Germany; Sunnyvale, California, U.S.
- Key people: Fabian von Kuenheim (lead investor, advisory board); Holger G. Weiss (advisory board); Gunnar Gräf (advisory board)
- Products: Software, GECKO, FLAMENCO, Carnival SDK
- Website: www.gestigon.com

Gestigon (stylized as gestigon) is a software development company founded in September 2011, to develop software for gesture control and body tracking based on 3D depth data.

As of 2016, Gestigon began developing augmented reality and automotive solutions for Audi, Renault and Volkswagen, and also AR/VR headsets.

In March 2017, Gestigon was acquired by Valeo, a French automotive supplier.

== History ==
The company was founded by Sascha Klement, Erhardt Barth, and Thomas Martinetz.

Sascha Klement worked as a student assistant and Ph.D. student for the professors Thomas Martinetz and Erhardt Barth, who have been developing software solutions based on time-of-flight sensors at the University of Lübeck since 2002. Together they founded Gestigon in 2011 with seed-funding from High-Tech Gründerfonds, Mittelständische Beteiligungsgesellschaft Schleswig-Holstein and local business angels.

In March 2012, Moritz von Grotthuss joined the company as advisor and later rose to CEO. In the same month, Gestigon was 1 of 15 companies that received an Innovation Award at CeBIT 2012.

In January 2013, Gestigon participated at CES in Las Vegas and, later that year, also at TechCrunch Disrupt in New York City. The next year Visteon and Volkswagen used Gestigon's gestures solutions in their products presented at CES 2014. It won the CeBIT Innovation Award again in 2014.

Gestigon's technologies were included Audi at CES 2015 and CES 2016; Volkswagen and Infineon. Gestigon launched its Virtual Reality solution Carnival at the TechCrunch Disrupt in San Francisco in September 2015, using an Oculus Rift and different depth sensors. The first demo using a mobile device was done at the CES in 2015. In 2015, Gestigon partnered with Inuitive, a 3D computer vision and image processors developer, to create a VR unit. The system was presented at CES 2016 assembled on an Oculus Rift development kit.

In July 2015, Gestigon closed its Series A financing round from with nbr technology ventures GmbH as a primary investor headed by Fabian von Kuenheim and High-Tech Gründerfonds and Vorwerk Direct Selling Ventures. Fabian von Kuenheim became chairman of the advisory board which was also composed of the German entrepreneur Holger G. Weiss and the French investor Gunnar Graef. In March 2017, Gestigon was acquired by French automotive supplier, Valeo. In March 2017, Gestion developed software that recognizes driving gestures.

== Products ==
Gestigon develops software that works with 3D sensors to recognize human gestures, poses and biometrical features in real time, such as:

- Gecko, a feature tracker that tracks an individual and measures their biometric features,
- Flamenco, a piece of software for finger and hand gesture control,
- Carnival SDK, software for augmented reality and virtual reality, which allows users to see and use their hands in virtual interfaces.

Gestigon's solutions are based on skeleton recognition. Their software recognizes body parts in 3D data to make the recognition faster and more accurate.
