= Wireless Broadband Alliance =

Wireless Broadband Alliance (WBA)
- Industry: Telecommunications
- Founded: 2003
- Website: www.wballiance.com

Founded in 2003, the Wireless Broadband Alliance (WBA) undertakes programs and activities to address business and technical issues, as well as opportunities, for member companies. WBA work areas include standards development, industry guidelines, trials, certification and advocacy. Its key programs include Next Gen Wi-Fi, OpenRoaming, 5G, IoT, Testing & Interoperability, and Policy & Regulatory Affairs, with member-led Work Groups dedicated to resolving standards and technical issues.

== Membership and governance ==
WBA’s membership includes major operators, service providers & industry players and other major companies from around the world.

WBA Board has 13 representatives from operators and non-operators groups, and is elected bi- annually. JR Wilson, Vice President, Tower Strategy and Roaming, AT&T Services, Inc, was re-elected WBA Chairman in January 2020 to a two-year term.

WBA’s members are major operators, identity providers and leading technology companies across the Wi-Fi ecosystem with the shared vision.

=== Collaborations ===
The WBA works with the Wi-Fi Alliance to promote ease of use on and roaming between wireless hotspots.

The WBA also has ongoing partnerships with the following organizations:

- CableLabs
- GSMA
- 3GPP
- OnGo Alliance
- HTNG
- LoRa Alliance
- Multefire Alliance
- Open Connectivity Foundation
- Small Cell Forum

== See also ==
- Wireless Broadband
- WiMAX
