= Sample abundance =

Signal-processing paradigm that trades precision for volume of measurements

Sample abundance is a signal processing paradigm in which very large numbers of low-precision measurements—often one-bit samples produced by comparators with time-varying thresholds—are leveraged to recover signals or parameters with high fidelity and reduced computational cost. Instead of enforcing difficult constraints (e.g., positive-semidefiniteness or low rank) during reconstruction, many problems under sample abundance are reformulated as overdetermined linear feasibility tasks defined by half-space inequalities. With sufficiently many binary measurements, these inequalities confine the solution to a small polyhedral region around the ground truth, making formerly essential constraints unnecessary. Beyond a critical number of samples, the algorithmic load collapses suddenly—a phenomenon that may be referred to as the sample abundance singularity.

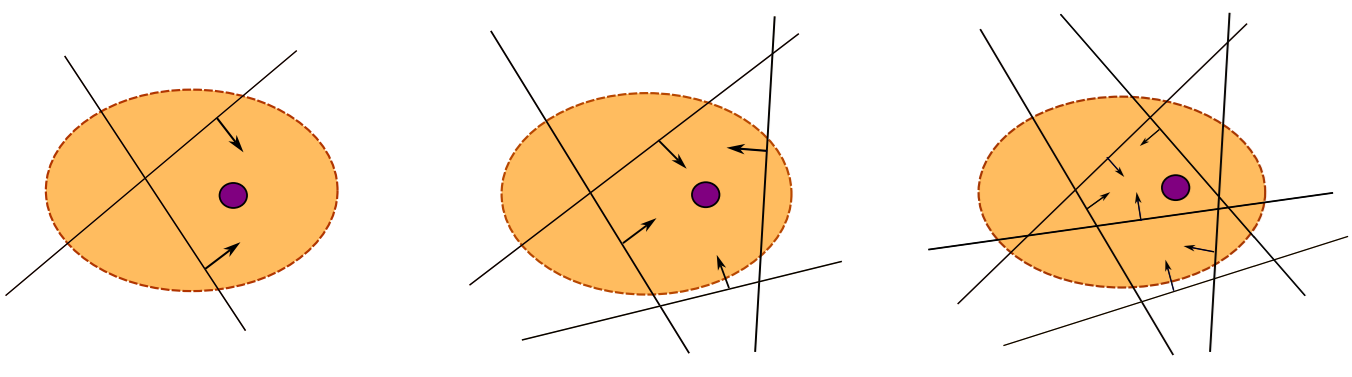
Conceptual illustration of a one-bit polyhedron (black lines) formed by half-spaces from binary comparisons. As samples increase, the feasible region shrinks around the true solution (purple) and can lie entirely inside a broader constraint set (orange).

== Background ==
One-bit and few-bit analog-to-digital converters (ADCs) are attractive in applications such as massive MIMO and radar because comparators are inexpensive, fast, and power-efficient. Introducing dither or time-varying thresholds allows binary signs to retain sufficient statistical information for estimation, including covariance and spectrum recovery via generalized arcsine-law results. Hybrid architectures such as Unlimited One-Bit Sampling (UNO) combine modulo folding with one-bit thresholds to further increase dynamic range while retaining low hardware cost. Related efforts span low-resolution MIMO channel estimation and radar processing with binary data.

== Definition ==
Let a one-bit sample be obtained by comparing a measurement $y_k$ with a threshold $\tau_k$: $r_k=\operatorname{sgn}(y_k-\tau_k)\in\{-1,+1\}.$ Each observation yields the linear inequality $r_k (y_k-\tau_k)\ge 0$. Stacking many samples and writing $\mathbf y=\mathbf A\mathbf x$ for linear sensing gives the one-bit polyhedron:

$$\mathcal P_{\mathbf x}=\{\ \mathbf x\in\mathbb R^d \mid \mathbf P \mathbf x \succeq \mathbf b\ \}$$,

where $\mathbf P$ collects signed rows of $\mathbf A$ and $\mathbf b$ stacks the threshold terms. Under sample abundance (many more inequalities than unknowns), $\mathcal P_{\mathbf x}$ typically has finite volume near the ground truth and shrinks as more samples are added.

== Sample abundance singularity ==
The sample abundance singularity refers to the observed regime change in which, after a problem-dependent measurement threshold is exceeded, computational requirements collapse from non-convex or constrained programs (e.g., semidefinite or rank-constrained formulations) to simple projections onto linear half-spaces. In this regime, enforcing positive semidefiniteness, rank, or sparsity may become unnecessary because the polyhedral feasible set already localizes the solution to within the desired accuracy.

== Mathematical formulation and examples ==
=== Phase retrieval ===
With quadratic measurements known only through one-bit comparisons to thresholds, each binary sample imposes an inequality in the lifted variable $\mathbf X=\mathbf x\mathbf x^\top$: $r_j^{(\ell)} \mathbf a_j^\top \mathbf X \mathbf a_j \ge r_j^{(\ell)} \tau_j^{(\ell)}.$ Beyond ample sampling, explicit PSD and rank-one constraints used by semidefinite programs (e.g., PhaseLift) can be omitted in practice.

=== Low-rank matrix sensing ===
For linear measurements $y_j=\operatorname{Tr}(\mathbf A_j^\top \mathbf X)$, one-bit signs $r_j^{(\ell)}=\operatorname{sgn}(y_j-\tau_j^{(\ell)})$ define a polyhedron in the matrix space; with abundant samples, nuclear-norm or rank constraints can become optional to enforce.

=== Compressed sensing ===
Given $\mathbf y=\mathbf A\mathbf x$ and signs $r_j^{(\ell)}=\operatorname{sgn}(\langle \mathbf a_j,\mathbf x\rangle-\tau_j^{(\ell)})$, the feasible set

$$\mathcal P_{\mathbf x}^{(C)}=\{\ \mathbf x'\in\mathbb R^n \mid r_j^{(\ell)}\langle \mathbf a_j,\mathbf x'\rangle \ge r_j^{(\ell)}\tau_j^{(\ell)}\ \}$$

can localize a sparse vector without explicit $\ell_1$ minimization when many binary comparisons are available.

== Algorithms ==
Because sample abundance yields overdetermined systems of linear inequalities, projection methods are natural. The Randomized Kaczmarz Algorithm (RKA) selects a row at random and projects the iterate; for consistent systems it converges linearly in expectation at a rate governed by a scaled condition number. The Sampling Kaczmarz–Motzkin (SKM) method draws a mini-batch of rows, chooses the most violated constraint, and projects, often accelerating convergence on large systems. Unrolled and plug-and-play variants tailored to one-bit data have also been reported for speed and robustness.

== Finite volume property ==
The Finite Volume Property (FVP) provides sample-complexity bounds ensuring that the polyhedron formed by one-bit inequalities has small volume (e.g., lies inside an $\varepsilon$-ball around the truth). For isotropic measurements, one set of results implies that

$m = O(\varepsilon^{-3})$ samples yield error $O(m^{-1/3})$,

with improved $O(\varepsilon^{-2})$ scaling when the signal belongs to structured sets (e.g., sparse vectors or low-rank matrices) whose Kolmogorov entropies are smaller. These guarantees help explain why explicit PSD, rank, or sparsity constraints can become redundant once the number of binary comparisons exceeds a problem-dependent threshold.

== Applications ==
- Low-resolution receivers in massive MIMO communications and detection.
- Radar and automotive sensing, including covariance-based DOA and one-bit Hankel matrix completion.
- Unlimited/one-bit sampling for bandlimited and finite-rate-of-innovation signals, and HDR imaging with sweeping thresholds.

== See also ==
- Kaczmarz method
- Compressed sensing
- Phase retrieval
- Quantization (signal processing)
