= Photoclinometry =

Process for making elevation maps

Photoclinometry, or shape-from-shading, is the process by which a 2-dimensional image of a surface is transformed into a surface map that represents different levels of elevation. It uses the shadows and light direction as reference points. It is used mostly to depict the surface of sculptures, to give an idea of how it would look in 3-dimensions. The techniques depend on very specific conditions, especially light direction.

== The process ==
When light bounces off an object, it reflects with location-specific brightness that depends on the shape of the object and the position of the lighting source. This reflection map can be used to create a bump map of a surface, which uses grayscale levels to depict the height of a point on a surface. Knowing the direction and angle of the light source, one can calculate the approximate height that a point has. However, the light direction and angle is usually unknown, which leads to poor quality images, or having to create multiple bump maps, each time trying different settings.

== Usage ==
- Some artists use photoclinometry to digitize a 3-dimensional representation of a sculpture.
- Geologists and those that study planetary science use it to get an idea of how the surface of a planet looks like, and generate topographic maps and digital elevation models (see photometric stereo). Planetary applications began with investigations of lunar topography as early as 1951 and has since been applied to the Martian surface.
- Glaciologists have used photoclinometry to characterize the surfaces of Antarctica and Greenland. Repeat photoclinometry is a method of building surfaces from a series of satellite image to investigate changes in ice sheet topography over time.
- Photoclinometry has been used to measure volcanic plume top topography on Earth.

== Problems ==
Light direction is very important to the quality of a photoclinometric image. Light that comes from directly over the surface (behind the camera) makes it hard to distinguish the shadows. Multiple light sources are also a problem, since they destroy important shadows required for the algorithms to work properly.

In order to solve these problems, new missions to other planets plan to use a process similar to stereoscopy in order to get a more accurate depiction of the surface on another planet. The Mars Reconnaissance Orbiter is one of the mission that attempts to do this. This process uses two images of one location taken from two separate lens on a camera, much in the same way humans do with their eyes. By using two images, they can get a 3-dimensional perspective of objects on the surface like we do.

== See also ==
- Photometric stereo
- Photogrammetry
- Stereoscopy
- Bump mapping
