= Random coordinate descent =

Optimization algorithm

Randomized (Block) Coordinate Descent Method is an optimization algorithm popularized by Nesterov (2010) and Richtárik and Takáč (2011). The first analysis of this method, when applied to the problem of minimizing a smooth convex function, was performed by Nesterov (2010). In Nesterov's analysis the method needs to be applied to a quadratic perturbation of the original function with an unknown scaling factor. Richtárik and Takáč (2011) provide iteration complexity bounds that do not require this assumption, meaning the method is applied directly to the objective function. Additionally, they generalize the framework to the problem of minimizing a composite function, specifically the sum of a smooth convex function and a (possibly nonsmooth) convex block-separable function.

$F(x) = f(x) + \Psi(x),$

where $\Psi(x) = \sum_{i=1}^n \Psi_i(x^{(i)}),$ $x\in R^N$ is decomposed into $n$ blocks of variables/coordinates: $x = (x^{(1)},\dots,x^{(n)})$ and $\Psi_1,\dots, \Psi_n$ are (simple) convex functions.

Example (block decomposition): If $x = (x_1,x_2,\dots,x_5) \in R^5$ and $n=3$, one may choose $x^{(1)} = (x_1,x_3), x^{(2)} = (x_2,x_5)$ and $x^{(3)} = x_4$.

Example (block-separable regularizers):

1. $n = N; \Psi(x) = \|x\|_1 = \sum_{i=1}^n |x_i|$
2. $N = N_1 + N_2 + \dots + N_n; \Psi(x) = \sum_{i=1}^n \|x^{(i)}\|_2$, where $x^{(i)} \in R^{N_i}$ and $\|\cdot\|_2$ is the standard Euclidean norm.

== Algorithm ==
Consider the optimization problem

$$\min_{x \in R^n} f(x),$$

where $f$ is a convex and smooth function.

Smoothness: By smoothness we mean the following: we assume the gradient of $f$ is coordinate-wise Lipschitz continuous with constants $L_1, L_2, \dots, L_n$. That is, we assume that

$$|\nabla_i f(x + h e_i) - \nabla_i f(x)| \leq L_i |h|,$$

for all $x \in R^n$ and $h \in R$, where $\nabla_i$ denotes the partial derivative with respect to variable $x^{(i)}$.

Nesterov, and Richtarik and Takac showed that the following algorithm converges to the optimal point:

Algorithm Random Coordinate Descent Method
    Input: 
  
    
      
        
          x
          
            0
          
        
        ∈
        
          R
          
            n
          
        
      
    
    {\displaystyle x_{0}\in R^{n}}
  
 //starting point
    Output: 
  
    
      
        x
      
    
    {\displaystyle x}
  


    set x := x_0

    for k := 1, ... do
        choose coordinate 
  
    
      
        i
        ∈
        {
        1
        ,
        2
        ,
        …
        ,
        n
        }
      
    
    {\displaystyle i\in \{1,2,\dots ,n\}}
  
, uniformly at random
        update 
  
    
      
        
          x
          
            (
            i
            )
          
        
        =
        
          x
          
            (
            i
            )
          
        
        −
        
          
            1
            
              L
              
                i
              
            
          
        
        
          ∇
          
            i
          
        
        f
        (
        x
        )
      
    
    {\displaystyle x^{(i)}=x^{(i)}-{\frac {1}{L_{i}}}\nabla _{i}f(x)}
  
 
    end for

- "←" denotes assignment. For instance, "largest ← item" means that the value of largest changes to the value of item.
- "return" terminates the algorithm and outputs the following value.

== Convergence rate ==
Since the iterates of this algorithm are random vectors, a complexity result would give a bound on the number of iterations needed for the method to output an approximate solution with high probability. It was shown in that if $k\geq \frac{2n R_L(x_0)}{\epsilon} \log \left(\frac{f(x_0)-f^*}{\epsilon \rho}\right)$, where $R_L(x)=\max_{y} \max_{x^* \in X^*} \{ \|y-x^*\|_L : f(y)\leq f(x) \}$, $f^*$ is an optimal solution ($f^* = \min_{x\in R^n}\{f(x)\}$), $\rho \in (0,1)$ is a confidence level and $\epsilon>0$ is target accuracy, then $\text{Prob}(f(x_k)-f^*> \epsilon) \leq \rho$.

== Example on particular function ==
The following Figure shows how $x_k$ develops during iterations, in principle. The problem is

$$f(x) = \tfrac{1}{2} x^T \left(\begin{array}{cc}
1 & 0.5 \\ 0.5 & 1
\end{array}
\right)
x -\left(\begin{array}{cc}
1.5 & 1.5
\end{array}
\right)x,\quad    x_0=\left(\begin{array}{ cc}
0   & 0
\end{array}
\right)^T$$

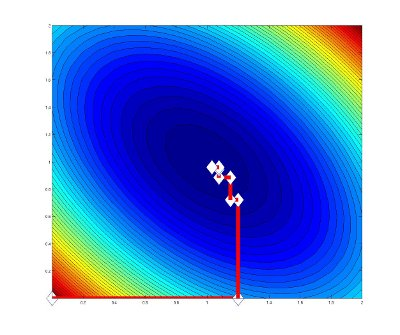

== Extension to block coordinate setting ==
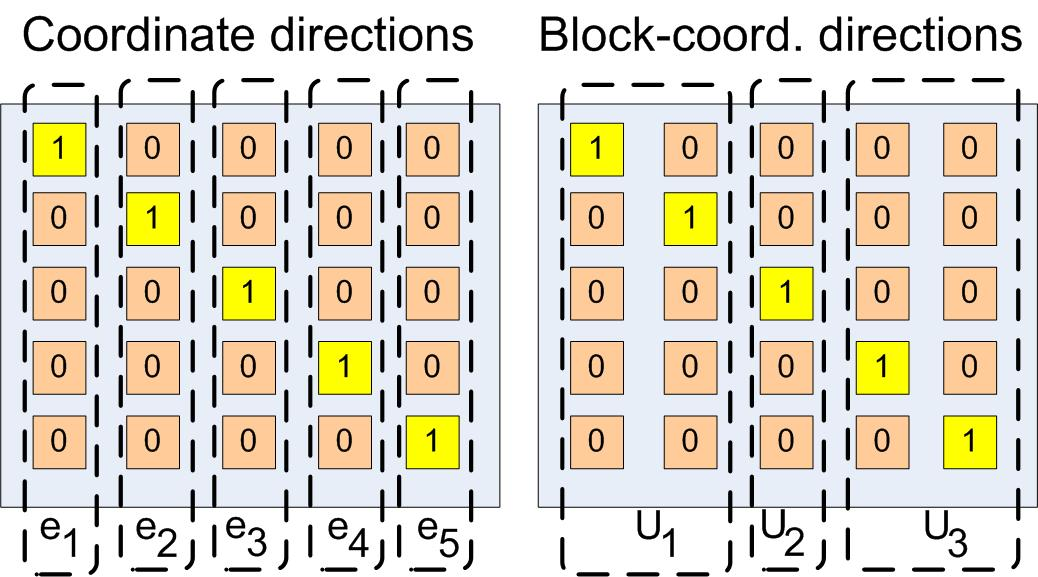
Blocking coordinate directions into Block coordinate directions

One can naturally extend this algorithm not only just to coordinates, but to blocks of coordinates. Assume that we have space $R^5$. This space has 5 coordinate directions, concretely $e_1 = (1,0,0,0,0)^T, e_2 = (0,1,0,0,0)^T, e_3 = (0,0,1,0,0)^T, e_4 = (0,0,0,1,0)^T, e_5 = (0,0,0,0,1)^T$ in which Random Coordinate Descent Method can move. However, one can group some coordinate directions into blocks and we can have instead of those 5 coordinate directions 3 block coordinate directions (see image).

== See also ==
- Coordinate descent
- Gradient descent
- Mathematical optimization
