= List of celebrity judoka =

The following is a list of celebrities who have trained in the martial art and sport of judo.

== Athletes ==
- Ronda Rousey (professional wrestler and mixed martial artist, b.1987), a 6th dan judoka, former champion in the mixed martial arts organization UFC, former professional wrestler with WWE.
- Yoshiro Akiyama (mixed martial artist and TV star, b. 1975). One FC fighter and a former UFC fighter. Known as Choo Sung-hoon in Korea. Also one of the stars of the 2023 South Korean reality television series Physical 100.
- Kayla Harrison (professional mixed martial artist and Judoka, b.1990), a 6th dan judoka, won the women's 78 kg in the 2010 World Judo Championships.

== Academics and educators ==
- Moshé Feldenkrais (scientist/healer/author/teacher, b.1904 d.1984) held a Doctor of Science in engineering from the Sorbonne, and was the founder of the Feldenkrais Method which was designed to improve human functioning by increasing self-awareness through movement. Feldenkrais started learning judo in 1930, and met Kano Jigoro in 1933. He became a close friend of Kano, and corresponded with him regularly. Kano chose him to be one of the doors through which the East attempts to meet the West. He was one of the first Europeans to be awarded a black belt (in 1936), and he received his 2nd dan in 1938. From his position on the European Judo Council, he began to scientifically study Judo, later incorporating the knowledge he gained through his self-rehabilitation. He founded the French Judo Association and published three books about judo.
- Terry Halpin (computer scientist): Halpin is an Australian academic who is well known in the field of modelling information systems, having authored five books and over one hundred technical papers. He holds a black belt in judo.
- Aza Raskin (computer scientist, b.1984): Aza Raskin, son of the late, noted human–computer interface expert Jef Raskin, is an American user experience and product design expert who practises judo. He is currently Head of User Experience at Mozilla Labs. Raskin gave his first talk on user interface at age 10 and by 20 he was speaking internationally.
- Kano Jigoro (educator, b.1860 d.1938): Kano was director of primary education for the Japanese Ministry of Education (文部省, Monbushō) from 1898 to 1901. He played a key role in getting judo and kendo made part of the Japanese public school programs. He was also a pioneer of international sports, and became the first Asian member of the International Olympic Committee (IOC), serving from 1909 until 1938. Kano was the founder of judo.

== Actors and entertainers ==
- Lucille Ball (actress): Ed Parker, the founder of American Kenpo Karate, taught judo to Lucille Ball and Vivian Vance on The Lucy Show show.
- James Cagney (actor b.1899 d.1986): Cagney was a judo black belt. Cagney performed numerous judo techniques in the film Blood on the Sun.
- Blackie Chen: Taiwanese TV host who was selected to train in judo as well as basketball in high school. He sparred with Xiao Huangqi in a TV show and could not escape from a pin. Blackie is a blue belt in judo.
- Sonny Chiba: 2nd-Dan black belt in Judo, mostly famous for portraying Hattori Hanzō in Kill Bill and Shadow Warriors
- Melanie C (formerly Sporty Spice of the Spice Girls): had to withdraw from her involvement in the TV series The Games in 2003 due to a knee injury sustained in the judo competition against 2002 Miss World Azra Akın.
- George Harris (judo movie star): Harris starred in a feature film titled "Judo's Gentle Tiger", also known as "The Year of the Gentle Tiger". A forerunner to "The Karate Kid", it was shot in the late 1970s, and was later broadcast as an NBC daytime program. Harris also appeared on talk shows and was twice a guest on "To Tell the Truth". He was a two-time Pan American judo champion, and four-time US National judo champion.
- Hiroyuki Ikeuchi: Best known for his role as Captain Saito in Space Battleship Yamato
- Brian Jacks (BBC Superstars): achieved national fame for his outstanding "Gym Test" performances on the BBC programme Superstars and made him a household name in England. His victories in the British and European Superstars lead to the creation of the branded computer games: Brian Jacks Superstar Challenge and Brian Jacks Uchi Mata. In 1984 he briefly appeared on the BBC show "Micro Live", where he set up his new Atari 800XL with his family. Jacks was the youngest ever British 8th dan in judo; was an Olympic medallist; and competed in over 3000 tournaments.
- Gene LeBell (stuntman/actor, b.1932 d.2022): LeBell worked on over 350 films and TV shows and was commonly known as "the Godfather of Grappling" and "the Toughest Man Alive". In 2002, Gene LeBell was promoted to 10th dan in judo by Jon Bluming in the Netherlands. In February 2005, he was promoted to 9th dan in Traditional Kodokan Judo by the USJJF.
- Chuck Norris (actor): Norris's introduction to martial arts took place in South Korea after enlisting in the U.S. Air Force in 1958. He left Korea with a black belt in Tang Soo Do, and a brown belt in judo. In his movies he can often be seen executing O Goshi, Uki Goshi, Seoi Nage, Waki Gatame and Tomoe Nage.
- Peter Sellers (actor/comedian, b.1925 d.1980): Sellers practiced judo and was appointed President of the London Judo Society in 1962.
- Valerie Singleton OBE (English television and radio presenter): Singleton started taking judo self-defense classes for women at the Budokwai in London in 2002.
- Bo Svenson (actor): The lead actor of the original Walking Tall movies is a fifth degree blackbelt in judo. He was also the 1961 Far East Judo Champion in the Heavyweight Division.
- Hillary Wolf (actress): American former child actress, most notable for her role as Megan in the Home Alone series. She was the Junior Judo world champion in 1994, and represented the United States in judo at the Olympics in 1996 and 2000.
- Bad News Brown (wrestler): Born Allen Coage, he started practicing judo at 15. Started his career at 22, Coage won the Amateur Athletic Union judo championship (heavyweight class) in 1966, 1968, 1969, 1970, and 1975, as well as winning the open division in 1970. He also competed in the Pan American Games, winning gold medals in the heavyweight class in 1967 and 1975. He lived in Japan for 2 years (1970 - 1972), farther studying judo at Nihon University before going to the 1976 Summer Olympics where he ultimately won a bronze medal. His victory made him the second American to medal in the sport and the first African American to win a solo Olympic Games medal in a sport other than boxing or track and field. He would eventually become a wrestler, most notably under the ring "Bad News Brown".

== Business ==
- Matsutaro Shoriki (sports commissioner / media mogul / politician, b.1885 d.1969): owned one of Japan's major daily newspapers, and founded Japan's first commercial television station. He also was elected to the House of Representatives and appointed to the House of Peers. He became Nippon Professional Baseball's (NPB) first commissioner in 1949, and in 1959, he was the first inductee into the Japanese Baseball Hall of Fame, and is known as the "father of Japanese professional baseball". In 1957, his biography was published in New York, titled Shoriki: Miracle Man of Japan. In 1969 he was awarded judo's highest rank by the Kodokan: 10th dan.
- Francesco Rulli (businessman / filmmaker): born in Florence is a 4th degree black belt (Yodan), current competitor and member of the NYAC Judo Club and coach for the NYAC's Saturday Morning Program for children up to 13 years old. Francesco Rulli also created the website www.JudoArts.com and his company Film Annex is the main sponsor of the New York Judo Open Cup, co-sponsored with the New York Athletic Club. The New York Open Judo Cup is held once a year and its in invitational tournament for teams from all over the world, in the last three years the winners of this cup were Germany in 2011 and 2012 and France in 2013.

== Models ==
- Jonathan Gavin (1966 – 2013) – Scottish judoka and model best known for winning the Gold medal in the (‍–‍81 kg) division at the 2001 World Masters. he balanced a successful athletic career with commercial modeling during the 1990s and 2000s. Modeling Alongside his athletic pursuits, he worked as a commercial model and secured small television roles throughout his modeling career. he died on February 5, 2013, at the age of 46, cause of death Brain Tumor.
- Anne Gavin (born Ann-Marie Stewart in 1967) is a Scottish former commercial model. She was the wife of the elite Scottish judoka and fellow model, Jonathan Gavin, whom she married in 1992. She is the mother of their three children, including Scottish Actor and Model Josh Gavin.
- Azra Akın (Turkish 2002 Miss World): won the judo competition in the TV series The Games in 2003.
- Laetitia Casta (Actress/Model): Casta was the official face of L'Oréal, Dior, and Chanel. She was the Guess? Jeans girl in 1993, and has appeared on over 100 magazine covers. She was Rolling Stone's Hottest Model of the Year. Casta has a brown belt in judo.
- Yasmin Le Bon (English supermodel): she and her husband Simon Le Bon practice judo at the Budokwai in London.

== Musicians ==
- Simon Le Bon (lead singer and lyricist of the pop/rock band Duran Duran): he and his wife Yasmin Le Bon are practicing judo at the Budokwai in London.
- Billy Thorpe (rock musician of Billy Thorpe and the Aztecs): learned judo from a coach of Anton Geesink in Brisbane, Australia. Thorpe used judo to throw two policemen who attacked him in a violent false arrest in Sydney, Australia in 1964.
- Xiao Huangqi: Taiwanese singer who learned judo since he was 4 when he lost his eyesight, achieved 2nd-dan black belt, and represented Taiwan in also earned bronze medal in FESPIC Games in Beijing in 1994, and went on to earn a seventh-place finish at 1996 Atlanta Paralympic Games

== Writers and directors ==
- Terence Donovan (photographer and film director b.1936 d.1996): directed Robert Palmer's music video Addicted to Love, which won the 1987 Grammy Award for Best Male Rock Vocal Performance. It was his idea to feature pale skinned models pretending to play backup, the visual element that made the video so memorable. He was also a black belt in judo and co-authored a popular judo book Fighting Judo with former World Judo Gold medallist Katsuhiko Kashiwazaki.
- Vojislav Stanimirović:(journalist, writer) out of NYC was close friends with Radomir Kovačević and trained him and his youngest son, Pavle, and is responsible for saving his life from a life of criminality. Radomir inspired Pavle to advance in any environment by transferring his education to Private Boarding Schools where students excelled in all sports using Judo as the foundation to build a strong platform.
- Guy Ritchie (film director): Guy Ritchie trains regularly in both judo and BJJ. He has a black belt in both.

== Politicians ==
- Ben Nighthorse Campbell (U.S. Senator for Colorado, 1993–2005): Campbell won three U.S. national championships and a gold medal at the 1963 Pan American Games judo competition. He was captain of the U.S. judo team in the 1964 Summer Olympics, and was chosen to carry the American flag during the closing ceremonies.
- William Hague (leader of the Conservative Party in the UK, 1997–2001): long-standing practitioner at the Budokwai in London. Judo is credited for transforming him from a "weak indecisive" "bit of a weed" into an "action man".
- Pierre Trudeau (former Prime Minister of Canada, 1968–1979 and 1980–1984): 2nd dan black belt, Takahashi School of Martial Arts in Ottawa.
- Vladimir Putin (Russian President, 2000–2008 and 2012–; Russian Prime Minister, 2008–2012): Putin was awarded 8th dan in 2012 and became the first Russian to have been awarded the eighth dan, joining a handful of judo fighters in the world who have achieved such status. Putin was awarded 7th dan in 2009 and 6th dan (prestigious red & white belt) at the Kodokan in 2000. In the 1970s, he was awarded a Master of Sports in both judo and sambo. Putin has described judo as "my favorite sport", and he continues to practice it. In 2004 he co-authored a book about judo, published in Russian as Judo with Vladimir Putin and in English as Judo: History, Theory, Practice. The book has now been made into a film called Judo with Vladimir Putin. Following the Russian invasion of Ukraine in February 2022, Putin was dropped by the International Judo Federation and stripped of his black belt in March of the same year.
- Theodore Roosevelt (US President 1901–1909): Roosevelt was the first world leader to learn judo. There is no evidence that he acquired rank of any kind, despite reporting much later that he was the first American to reach brown belt. Roosevelt trained during two periods in his life. The first took place from March to June 1902, with Professor John J. O’Brien of Boston. Roosevelt also trained from March 9, 1904, to no later than April 23, 1904, when he wrote a letter of thanks to his teacher, judo's first-ever 10th dan, Yamashita Yoshitsugu, "closing my wrestling lessons with you." A contemporary source said he took approximately 20 lessons during those two months. Roosevelt was instrumental in appointing Yamashita to teach judo at the US Naval Academy. The U. S. Judo Association posthumously promoted Roosevelt to honorary 8th Dan in 2007.
- Ulla Werbrouck (Belgian politician, 2007–): Olympic gold medalist and six-time European champion.
- Battulga Khaltmaa (Mongolian Politician): He became the president of Mongolia in July 2017. He is also known for being an industry leader as well as the president of the Mongolian Judo Association.

== Royalty ==
- Albert II (Prince of Monaco, 2005–): 1st dan black belt.

== Other ==
- Osama Bin Laden (leader of Al Qaeda 1988–2011): studied judo in university.
- Jeremy Glick (September 11 Flight 93 counterattacker): Glick's last words to his wife on United Airlines Flight 93 were: "We're going to rush the hijackers." Then he put down the phone. Glick was US National Collegiate Judo champion in 1993. In 2008 the U.S. Judo Association posthumously promoted him to the honorary rank of 10th dan in a ceremony held at the Flight 93 Memorial crash site in conjunction with the 6th anniversary of the 9/11 attacks. A memorial stone was also unveiled with his wife, daughter, parents, and many more family members in attendance. Kaddish for Glick was led by US Judo Olympic Bronze Medalist (Judo 1964) Jim Bregman a member of the Jewish Sports Hall of Fame, http://goltzjudo.com/glickaward.htm.
- Peter Senerchia, otherwise known as the professional wrestler Tazz, studied judo prior to entering the wrestling scene. His finishing move, the Tazzmission, is derived from the shime-waza technique kata ha jime.
- Marjorreta Delores Costello (Ifill) Sandiford (b.1949 d.1994), a petite model, otherwise known as De or Deloris, studied judo at the National Studium club location through the Barbados Judo Association and swiftly became the first female on the island to earn Shodan/Black Belt. This 5'2 powerhouse fought successfully in national, regional and international competitions against mainly men and won. Her favourite technique making her opponents, tap out. Her strongest skill, using Seishin Toitsu to place her hand in fire. Marjorreta's headstone is set to be plated and memorated in Barbados on (close to her birthday which is July 15) July 27, 2023. She died suddenly in her sleep due to heart complications while visiting Barbados for a Christmas vacation.
- Curtis LeMay, a general in the United States Air Force and the vice presidential running mate of American Independent Party candidate George Wallace in the 1968 presidential election. LeMay, who himself started to practice Judo to some extent, made practicing Judo a routine part of Air Force tours of duty in Japan, and many Americans brought home stories of a tiny old man (Mifune), throwing healthy young men without apparent effort.
