= Tsurumi =

Tsurumi (written:鶴見) may refer to:

== Places ==
- Tsurumi-ku, Yokohama
  - Tsurumi Station
  - Tsurumi Line
- Tsurumi River, Kanagawa
- Tsurumi-ku, Osaka
- Tsurumi, Ōita

== People ==
- Aya Tsurumi (鶴見彩, born 1992), a Japanese female basketball player
- Ayaka Tsurumi (鶴見綾香, born 1994), a Japanese female soccer player
- Kiyohiko Tsurumi (鶴見清彦, 1917–1976), a Japanese diplomat
- Ken Tsurumi (鶴見憲, 1895–1984), a Japanese politician
- Koko Tsurumi (鶴見虹子, born 1992), gymnast
- Moe Tsurumi (鶴見萌, born 1996), a Japanese singer
- Nobuhiko Tsurumi (鶴見信彦, born 1966), a Japanese baseball player
- Roppyaku Tsurumi (鶴見 六百, born 1965), Japanese video game producer
- Ryoya Tsurumi (鶴見凌也, born 2001), a Japanese baseball player
- Shingo Tsurumi (鶴見 辰吾, born 1964), Japanese actor
- Shuji Tsurumi (鶴見修治, born 1938), gymnast
- Shunsuke Tsurumi (鶴見俊輔, 1922–2015), philosopher
- Takao Tsurumi (鶴見孝夫, born 1939), a Japanese cinematographer
- Taro Tsurumi (鶴見太郎, born 1965), a Japanese historian
- Tomoyoshi Tsurumi (鶴見 智美, born 1979), Japanese footballer
- Toshitaka Tsurumi (鶴見 聡貴, born 1986), Japanese footballer
- Wataru Tsurumi (鶴見済, born 1964), a Japanese writer
- Yoshihiro Tsurumi (霍見芳浩, born 1935), economist
- Yoshiyuki Tsurumi (鶴見良行, 1926–1994), a Japanese anthropologist
- Yuki Tsurumi (鶴見ゆき), a Japanese voice actress
- Yuusuke Tsurumi (鶴見祐輔, 1885–1973), a Japanese politician
