= Radiata Stories =

2005 video game

- North American box art
- Developer: tri-Ace
- Publisher: Square Enix
- Director: Naoki Akiyama
- Producer: Yoshinori Yamagishi
- Programmer: Yoshiharu Gotanda
- Artists: Takashi Joono; Hiroshi Konishi
- Writer: Masatoshi Midori
- Composer: Noriyuki Iwadare
- Platform: PlayStation 2
- Release: JP: January 27, 2005; NA: September 6, 2005
- Genre: Action role-playing
- Mode: Single-player

Radiata Stories (Note: Radiata Stories (ラジアータ ストーリーズ, Rajiaata Sutooriizu)) is an action role-playing video game developed by tri-Ace and published by Square Enix for the PlayStation 2. It was released on January 27, 2005, in Japan and September 6 in North America.

The game received mixed reception in both Japan and in North America upon release, though over time it has developed a loyal fanbase. It sold over 413,000 copies worldwide. Noriyuki Iwadare composed the soundtrack.

== Gameplay ==
Radiata Stories places great emphasis on its persistent world and non-player characters (NPCs), each with their own lives, lifestyles, jobs, personalities, homes, dialogues and schedules, which are controlled by the game's Day/Night system.

The game provides the novel ability to kick almost anything. Kicking furniture and other inanimate objects will occasionally turn up items or dagols (the local currency). Kicking NPCs several times will cause them to fight Jack, or summon guards to fight for or with them. Jack gains experience, money, and possibly items when he wins these duels, but will not lose the game if he is defeated. Jack may only win a duel against each character once each day.

=== Combat ===
There is no overworld map during fights. Battles takes place on a separate screen in real time, though monsters appear on the field screen. The player has direct control of Jack's movement and actions in all three dimensions, though bringing up menus pauses the action. Jack is the only character the player controls directly; all other party members are run by the in-game AI. The player can issue commands to individual party members, and the entire party can be ordered into tactical formations via the "Link System".

=== NPC recruitment ===
176 NPCs are recruitable. Some need only to be talked to, while others must be placated with fetch quests, dueled, recruited after Jack or a certain character has reached a certain level, or during certain moments in the game's story. After recruitment, they are placed on his "Friends List", at which point the player may include most of them in Jack's party at almost any time. The Friends List also provides capsule biographies for each character. It is impossible to complete everything during a single playthrough.

NPC party members can strengthen their single skill, but they do not learn new ones, and cannot be given new weapons, armors and accessories, so skills and equipment are significant criteria in choosing one's teammates. There is also no "magic" stat, forcing the player to constantly recruit new party members as magic spells do not increase in power.

Depending on the path the player chooses, they will lose certain characters that they recruited, and characters they didn't recruit will be unrecruitable for the rest of the game. Also, certain areas of the game will be inaccessible.

=== Post-game play ===
After completing the game, the player may continue playing the same game, unlocking a bonus dungeon, the Dragon Lair Cave. If the player chooses the option "Strong from Start", they will retain all their skills, money, and some items. All the characters the player recruited will be kept in their Friends List, but the player must recruit the characters again in subsequent playthroughs.

== Plot ==
=== Setting ===
Radiata Stories takes place in the land of Radiata. The land has many regions linked by great bridges. In the center region is Radiata City, where the story starts and may continue, given the human path is chosen.

In Radiata, humans and fairy creatures live together in peace until the story progresses. Just about halfway through the game, the player must choose a side by either choosing the Human path or the Non-Human path.

=== Characters ===
The three main characters of Radiata Stories are Jack Russell, an insubordinate and happy-go-lucky teenager; Ridley Silverlake, a composed female Knight who was trained to be a warrior since birth and feels the pressure of expectations from others; and Ganz Rothschild, the polite and gentle Captain of their brigade who is prone to becoming overexcited. Prominent supporting characters include the Prime Minister Larks; the cunning Knight Cross Ward; Lord Jasne, Ridley's overprotective father and the Lord Chamberlain of Radiata Castle; Lucian, Lord Jasne's advisor; and Gawain Rothschild, Ganz's father and presumed murderer of Jack's father, Cairn Russell.

The 300 characters and 175 recruitable NPCs of Radiata Stories were all given unique personalities and backstories. Every time a character is unlocked, he or she shows up on the player's Friends List, which also provides a summary of their history or personality. Due to the game having two mutually exclusive story branches, it is impossible to recruit every NPC during the same playthrough. Thus, the game must be played at least twice to unlock all characters' entries on the Friends List.

Radiata is home to Radiata Castle, its Knights of the realm and four Guilds. Most humans in town belong to one of the guilds, while others, including many from the country side, do not claim any guild affiliation. Fairy creatures are grouped by species.

=== Story ===
The game begins with Jack, the protagonist, joining the Knights of Radiata under the command of Captain Ganz Rothschild, son of Gawain Rothschild, the alleged killer of Cairn Russell, Jack's father. Also in his brigade is a young girl named Ridley Silverlake. One day, while trying to broker a trade agreement with the elves, Jack's brigade is attacked by blood orcs. The knights slay the orcs, but Ridley is seriously wounded during the battle. Her life is saved when her spirit gets merged with that of an elf who was killed by one of the blood orcs. After Ridley's father, Lord Jasne, finds out what happened, he pressures Prime Minister Lord Larks into expelling Jack and Ganz from the knights.

Jack goes on to join another group of mercenaries from Theatre Vancoor. Ridley is promoted to captain, but guilt over the expulsion of Jack and Ganz slowly builds in her, and she rebels. Ganz is unable to pass the test necessary to join Theater Vancoor, and through several encounters joins Void, the bandit guild.

As the game progresses, tension builds between the humans and the non-humans. One day, the Radiata Knights are sent to persuade the dwarves to continue trade with the humans. During negotiations, however, Cross Ward, leader of the squadron of knights, disobeys his orders and has the knights attack the dwarves. The dwarves that are not killed in the battle are enslaved. This starts a war between the humans and the non-humans.

Days later, Jack is visited by Ridley, who tells him that she is going to visit the elf capital city. At this point, the player must choose to either follow Ridley, or attend a meeting at Radiata Castle with Larks.

If the player chooses to attend the meeting, Jack is reinstated as a Radiata Knight. He learns that the non-humans are protected by four dragons, based on the four elements. One was killed by his father many years ago, and another was killed by Cross Ward when he enslaved the dwarves. Jack is ordered to accompany Cross and General Dynas to kill the remaining two. Jack also encounters Gawain and vows to kill him.

If the player follows Ridley to the elf city, Jack joins the fairy creatures in the war against the humans. Cross kills the dragons instead of Jack, who attempts to defend the dragons. Jack also learns the truth about his father's death from Gawain, who joins Jack.

After the dragons are slain, Ridley visits Jack and informs him that she is going south to meet her destiny. After a final skirmish between the humans and the fairy creatures, the king's advisor turns into the Silver Dragon Aphelion, one of the two apocalyptic dragons. Aphelion flies south, in the same direction that Ridley went, so Jack follows.

At the castle, Jack finds that the Gold Dragon, Quasar, the other apocalyptic dragon, plans to use Ridley as a vessel to destroy the humans. If Jack followed the human path, Aphelion kills Ridley to prevent this. Enraged by Ridley's death, Jack kills the Silver Dragon. He then leaves Radiata. If Jack followed the non-human path, he is able to prevent Ridley's death, and defeats Aphelion. The victory comes at the cost of both Ganz and Gawain. Jack and Ridley then return to Radiata together.

=== Cameos ===
tri-Ace incorporated characters and references to their other games in Radiata Stories. Ganz wears Star Ocean 2's Claude C. Kenni's clothes when he is part of the Bandit Guild. Jack can obtain Fayt Armor, which changes his appearance to that of Fayt Leingod from Star Ocean 3. Four bonus bosses are from other games: Lenneth Valkyrie and Lezard Valeth from Valkyrie Profile; and Gabriel Celestra and the Ethereal Queen, who are tri-Ace staples. Of these, only Valkyrie is recruitable and her armor can also be spotted inside the kings' chambers in the Radiata Castle, as part of the background.

== Audio ==
The soundtrack was composed by Noriyuki Iwadare. Prior to this, all tri-Ace music was composed by Motoi Sakuraba. Keeping in line with their tradition to refer to past games, three of Sakuraba's original compositions were rearranged by Iwadare. These are "Mission to Deep Space" (also in Star Ocean 2, Valkyrie Profile, and Star Ocean 3), "An Incarnation of Devil "(Star Ocean 2, Valkyrie Profile, and Star Ocean 3), and "Highbrow" (also in Star Ocean 3). Tri-Crescendo, which has a strong affiliation with Sakuraba, was credited with "Sound Direction" for the game. Furthermore, the soundtrack was released under the TEAM Entertainment label which is the primary promoter and distributor of Sakuraba.

The original soundtrack was 2 CDs with 79 songs. One month later Iwadare released "Radiata Stories: Arranged Album" which rearranged 16 songs from the original soundtrack.

The Sacramento Bee said the music was "peppy and cheerful, if unmemorable" but that the sound effects were "largely recycled from the developer's previous games, all the way back to 1999's "Star Ocean: The Second Story". GameSpot remarked that "none of the music will get stuck in your head, but you won't want to mute it either". Game Informer said the soundtrack was a "masterpiece". The game does not support Dolby Surround sound.

In 2004, all Japanese preorders of Radiata Stories came with a bonus audio disc, "tri-Ace Battle Sound Collection". The disc contained 2 battle themed tracks from Star Ocean, Star Ocean 2, Star Ocean 3, Valkyrie Profile, and Radiata Stories, respectively.

The theme song of the Japanese version of the game, "Fortune", was sung by Japanese Pop star Nami Tamaki, who became known for her debut single "Believe", the third opening theme of Mobile Suit Gundam SEED. She also played a recruitable party character of the same name in the game. The character Nami was modeled after Tamaki's likeness and her lines were voiced by the singer. It was her first single of 2005 and her 16th single overall. A music video with scenes from Radiata Stories and her dressed in her character's clothing was released in January 2005. The Japanese television advertisement for Radiata Stories featured the song in the background. This song is found in her second album Make Progress, which also includes "Reason", the first ending theme for Mobile Suit Gundam SEED Destiny.

The character's name was changed to Rachel in the English version and "Fortune" played during the ending credits.

== Reception ==
Reception

Aggregate scores
Aggregator	Score
GameRankings	76%
Metacritic	74/100

Review scores
Publication	Score
Electronic Gaming Monthly	7.5/10
Famitsu	36/40; Famitsu PS2: 27/30
Game Informer	9.25/10
GameSpot	7.7/10
GameSpy	60/100
IGN	8/10
Official U.S. PlayStation Magazine	3.5/5
PlayStation: The Official Magazine	6.5/10
Dengeki PlayStation	82.5/100
Hyper PlayStation	8/10

Radiata Stories was highly anticipated in Japan receiving the "Game Awards Future" by the Computer Entertainment Supplier's Association in 2004 which is awarded to games that are "expected to be major hits". It was the 12th most pre-ordered game the week of November 17, 2004. According to Famitsu, it was the 20th most wanted game in early October but had jumped up to the 3rd most wanted the week before its release.

A Japanese reviewer noted that the game had humorous dialogue but a simple battle system which made it suitable for beginners. The game sold well in Japan where it debuted as the top-selling game for two weeks, selling 152,000 copies, 54% of the ordered shipment, the day it debuted. It was the 11th best selling game the first half of 2005 and the 37th best-selling game in Japan in 2005 overall selling 10,000 more copies than Devil May Cry 3 and selling about 294,000 copies overall in Japan.

During an interview, Roppyaku Tsurumi of SCEJ said most Japanese RPG character designs were cookie-cutter and indistinct noting "even when I look at the characters in Radiata Stories, it just looks like the other games" but he had no problems distinguishing manga characters.

The North American reception to Radiata Stories was lukewarm. Radiata Stories was the top rental on GameFly the week of its debut. and debuted at the 20 most profitable game for September. Overall, it sold about 119,000 copies outside Japan total for the month of September. Mainstream reviewers enjoyed the game overall stating that, while not ground-breaking, the game was simple, whimsical, and entertaining.

Radiata Stories was awarded "Game of the Month" in Game Informer in October 2005. Jack Russell placed No. 6 on Game Informer's "Top 10 Heroes of 2005" list and Radiata Stories was in "The Top 50 Games of 2005" in the January 2006 issue of Game Informer and in "The Top 12 Games of 2005" by Games Radar. It was nominated for "Role-Playing Game of the Year" during the 9th Annual Interactive Achievement Awards held by the Academy of Interactive Arts & Sciences. It was also nominated for Best Role Playing Game of 2005 by 1UP.com.

== Related media ==
Two 5-issue manga series were released based on Radiata Stories: The Epic of JACK and The Song of RIDLEY. Both were 5 issues published between 2005 and 2007.

A limited run of a boxed set of 6 figurines from Radiata Stories and Star Ocean included Jack and Ridley.

== See also ==
- Radiant Historia – a similarly-titled game with common development staff members
