= If It Moves, Shoot It! =

1989 video game

- Developer: Emerald Software
- Publishers: Martech (Amiga); Broderbund (MS-DOS)
- Platforms: Amiga, MS-DOS
- Release: 1988: Amiga; 1989: MS-DOS
- Genre: Shoot 'em up

If It Moves, Shoot It! is a shoot 'em up video game developed by Irish studio Emerald Software and published by Martech for the Amiga in 1988. A version for MS-DOS was released in North America by Broderbund in 1989.

== Gameplay ==
If It Moves, Shoot It! is a shoot 'em up where the player attacks all targets that appear on-screen, battling the Korts to rescue the settlers in the Valley of the Ancients. The game can be played using a joystick or keyboard.

== Reception ==
The game was reviewed in 1991 in Dragon #166 by Hartley, Patricia, and Kirk Lesser in "The Role of Computers" column. The reviewers gave the game 3 out of 5 stars.
