= Michael Jackson in video games =

There are at least nine video games that Michael Jackson has composed music for or are directly related to him. Sega was the developer for at least six of them: the arcade and Mega Drive/Genesis versions of Michael Jackson's Moonwalker, Michael Jackson in Scramble Training for arcades, Sonic the Hedgehog 3 for the Mega Drive/Genesis, and Space Channel 5 and Space Channel 5: Part 2 for the Dreamcast. The other three were produced by other companies: Moonwalker for home computers by U.S. Gold, Michael Jackson: The Experience by Ubisoft, and Planet Michael by SEE Virtual Worlds.

== Michael Jackson's Moonwalker ==
Michael Jackson's Moonwalker is a franchise for several video games based on the film of the same name created by Sega (for arcades and the Mega Drive/Genesis) and U.S. Gold (for home computers) in 1989 and 1990 that incorporate the personage of and were co-developed by Jackson himself. The arcade version, home video games and home computer versions all differ in terms of gameplay, but the story and concept remain constant. The story, which is taken from the Moonwalker film, follows Michael, using various music and dance related abilities, on a quest to save kidnapped children from the hands of the evil "Mr. Big". The games incorporated synthesized versions of the musician's hits, such as "Beat It" and "Smooth Criminal". The games have now achieved cult status and are remembered for being a memorable point in Jackson's change to a different stage persona from "Thriller", to "Bad".

The game's development dates back to 1988, when Michael Jackson contacted Sega about developing a video game that would capture his persona. Sega and Jackson then began working on an arcade video game based on his Moonwalker film and "Smooth Criminal" music video released that year. The Moonwalker arcade game was eventually introduced in 1990.

== Other Sega games ==
=== Michael Jackson in Scramble Training ===
Michael Jackson in Scramble Training was released for arcades in 1993, running on Sega's AS-1 motion simulator cabinet. It was an interactive film ride featuring pre-rendered 3D computer graphics and allowed up to eight players to interact with the game. Jackson provided voice acting and appeared in live-action full-motion video (FMV) sequences, while some of his music was also used.

=== Sonic the Hedgehog 3 ===
Michael Jackson was allegedly involved in the music production of Sonic the Hedgehog 3. Conflicting accounts arose as to why he left the project, including the 1993 child sexual abuse accusations against him, or that he was unhappy with the sound quality of the Genesis which was generally considered inferior to Super Nintendo Entertainment System and other competing game consoles of the time period. On June 23, 2022, former Sonic Team leader Yuji Naka confirmed that Michael's songs were in the released game. Jackson was never officially credited within the game.

=== Space Channel 5 and Space Channel 5: Part 2 ===
In Space Channel 5 and its sequel Space Channel 5: Part 2, Jackson appears as a fictional character named Space Michael (スペースマイケル, Supēsu Maikeru), whose likeness and voice is provided by Jackson. In both games, Michael speaks in English, which is subtitled into Japanese in the Japanese version.

In the first Space Channel 5 Michael uses his singing skills against a singing robot and joins Ulala in the fight against Purge after she rescues him from the Rhythm Rogues. Originally meant to be a one-time cameo appearance, Jackson had a more prominent role in Space Channel 5: Part 2, where he became the new head of Space Channel 5. Whilst Ulala is distracted by a fake scoop, the headquarters are attacked, and Space Michael is kidnapped by Purge and the Rhythm Rogues. Ulala rescues him in a level featuring several of Michael's signature dance moves. He then joins Ulala in a confrontation against Purge.

The May 2007 issue of EGM contains a quote from series creator Tetsuya Mizuguchi concerning Jackson's involvement:

"We were in the middle of production of Space Channel 5, in 1998 or 1999. I got a call from the U.S. from my partner - the executive producer of Space Channel 5 - and he said, 'Oh, Michael wants to act in Space Channel 5.' I said, 'Who's Michael?' 'Who is Michael Jackson?' he said, 'The Michael Jackson - the real Michael Jackson.'

My partner had shown him the 60-to-70 percent complete version, when it was almost at the end of the game. We had one month to finalize. But Michael wanted to do something, so we suggested that if he was OK with it, we could program the people in the game to do the Michael Jackson dance when taken over by aliens. He said 'yeah.' We initially had five aliens who danced. One of them became Michael Jackson.",

== Michael Jackson: The Experience ==
Michael Jackson: The Experience is a music video game based on Jackson's music and songs. It was developed and published by Ubisoft and Triumph International (subsidiary by The Michael Jackson Company LLC), and was released on November 23, 2010, for the Wii, Nintendo DS, and PlayStation Portable. Later it was released on other platforms: Xbox 360 (compatible with Kinect), PlayStation 3 (compatible with PlayStation Move), Nintendo 3DS, PlayStation Vita and iOS. The game features many of Michael Jackson's hits, such as "Bad", "Beat It", "Smooth Criminal" and "Billie Jean".

== Planet Michael ==
Planet Michael was a planned MMORPG based on Jackson's music. It was being developed by SEE MJ Virtual Worlds (The Michael Jackson Company LLC and SEE Entertainment) and was originally scheduled for release in 2011, but was eventually canceled. Planet Michael was to be based within the Entropia Universe.

== Ready 2 Rumble Boxing: Round 2 ==
Ready 2 Rumble Boxing: Round 2 is a boxing game for the Dreamcast, Nintendo 64, PlayStation, PlayStation 2 (a North American launch title for the system), and Game Boy Advance. Michael Jackson is one of a number of celebrity characters unlockable through gameplay.
