= Ichigao Yokoana Kofun Cluster =

Artificial caves in Yokohama, Japan

- 市ヶ尾横穴古墳群 (Japanese)
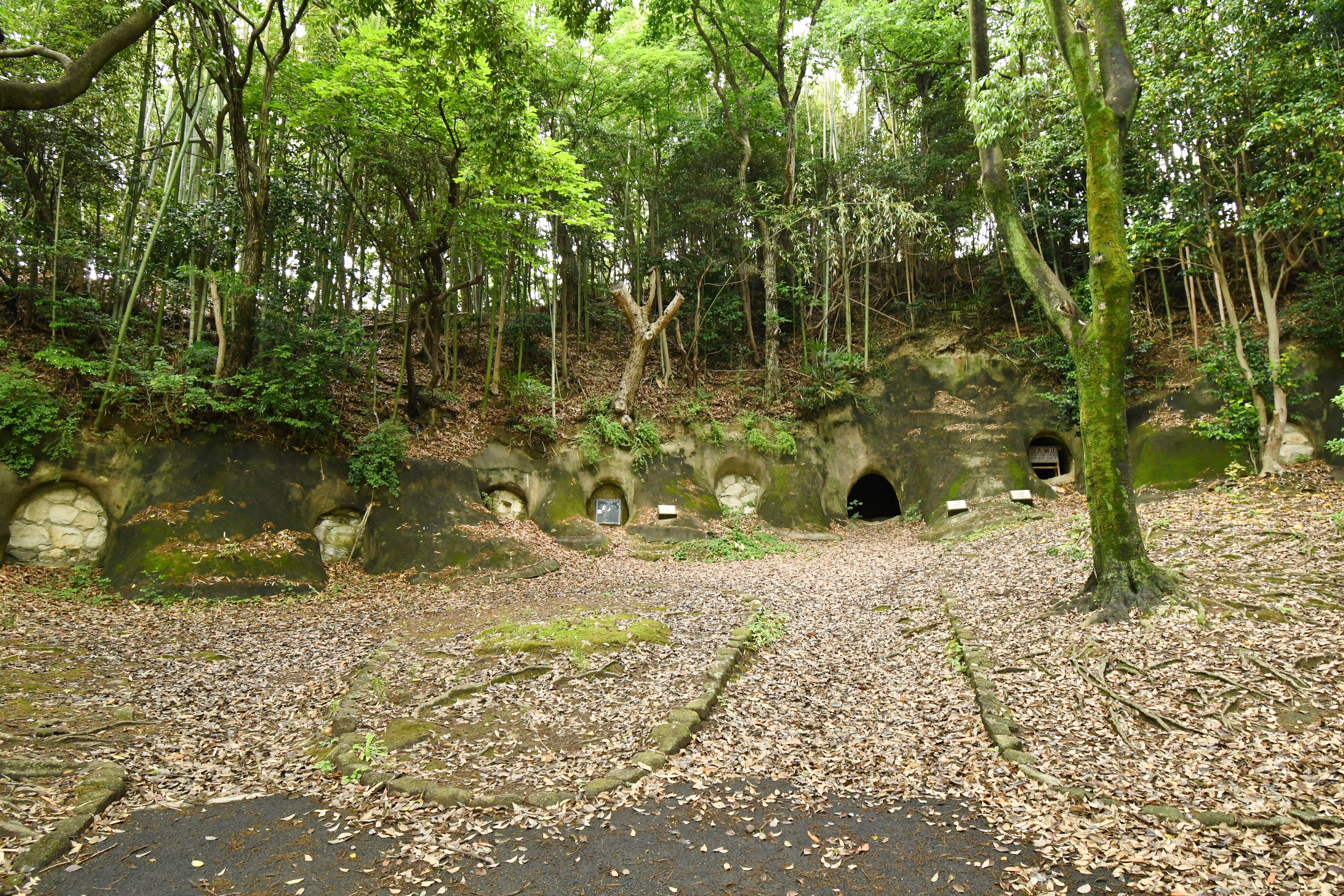
- Ichigao Yokoana Kofun Cluster, Group A

- Ichigao Yokoana Kofun Cluster Ichigao Yokoana Kofun Cluster (Japan)
- Interactive map of Ichigao Yokoana Kofun Cluster
- 35°33′26.65″N 139°32′23.97″E
- Type: necropolis
- Periods: Kofun period
- Location: 1639-2 Ichigao, Aoba-ku, Yokohama, Japan
- Region: Kanto region

History
- Built: 6th-7th century CE

Site notes
- Owner: Public
- Public access: Yes (park)
- Kanagawa Prefecture Historic Site

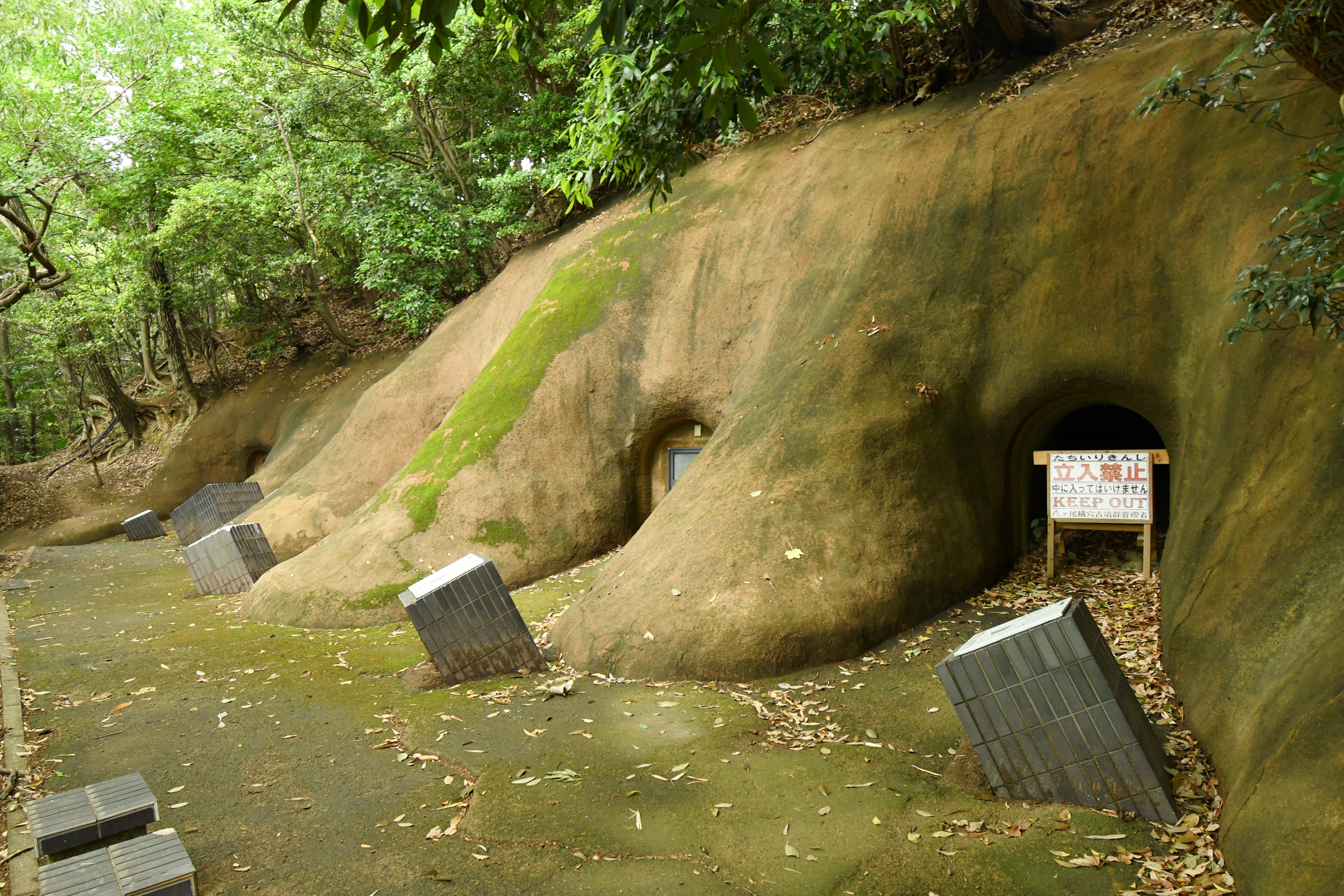
Tomb in Group B

The Ichigao Yokoana Kofun Group (市ヶ尾横穴古墳群, Ichigao yokoanabo-gun) is the name for a cluster of yokoanabo tombs dug in artificial caves in tuff cliffs in the Ichigao neighborhoods of Aoba-ku, Yokohama, , Kanagawa Prefecture, Japan. It was designated as a Kanagawa Prefectural Historic Site in 1957.

== Overview ==
In the latter half of the Kofun period, the class of people buried expanded to include wealthy farmers and other commoners, and mass cemeteries in which side holes were dug into the slope of a hill to provide a burial chamber began to replace burial mounds. Such cemeteries could contain dozens to hundreds of tombs, with each tomb containing multiple burials.

The Ichigao yokoanabo cluster is located in the hilly area on the left bank of the Tsurumi River (Tanimoto River). The tombs were constructed by excavating the cliff face of a valley opening southward towards the river. They are divided into Group A on the north side with 12 tombs and Group B on the south side with seven tombs, and are thought to have built during the late Kofun period, from the late 6th to the late 7th centuries. The structure inside each tomb varies from one to another, suggesting that the design varied over time. Excavations were conducted in 1933 and 1956. Grave goods such as swords, and Sue ware and Haji ware pottery have been found both inside and outside the tombs. The area is preserved as a archaeological park, with a walking path running alongside the tombs.

Approximately 800 meters west of this site lies the Inarimae Kofun Cluster (another Kanagawa Prefectural Historical Site), which contains the tombs of successive chieftains and their families who unified the Tsuzuki area.

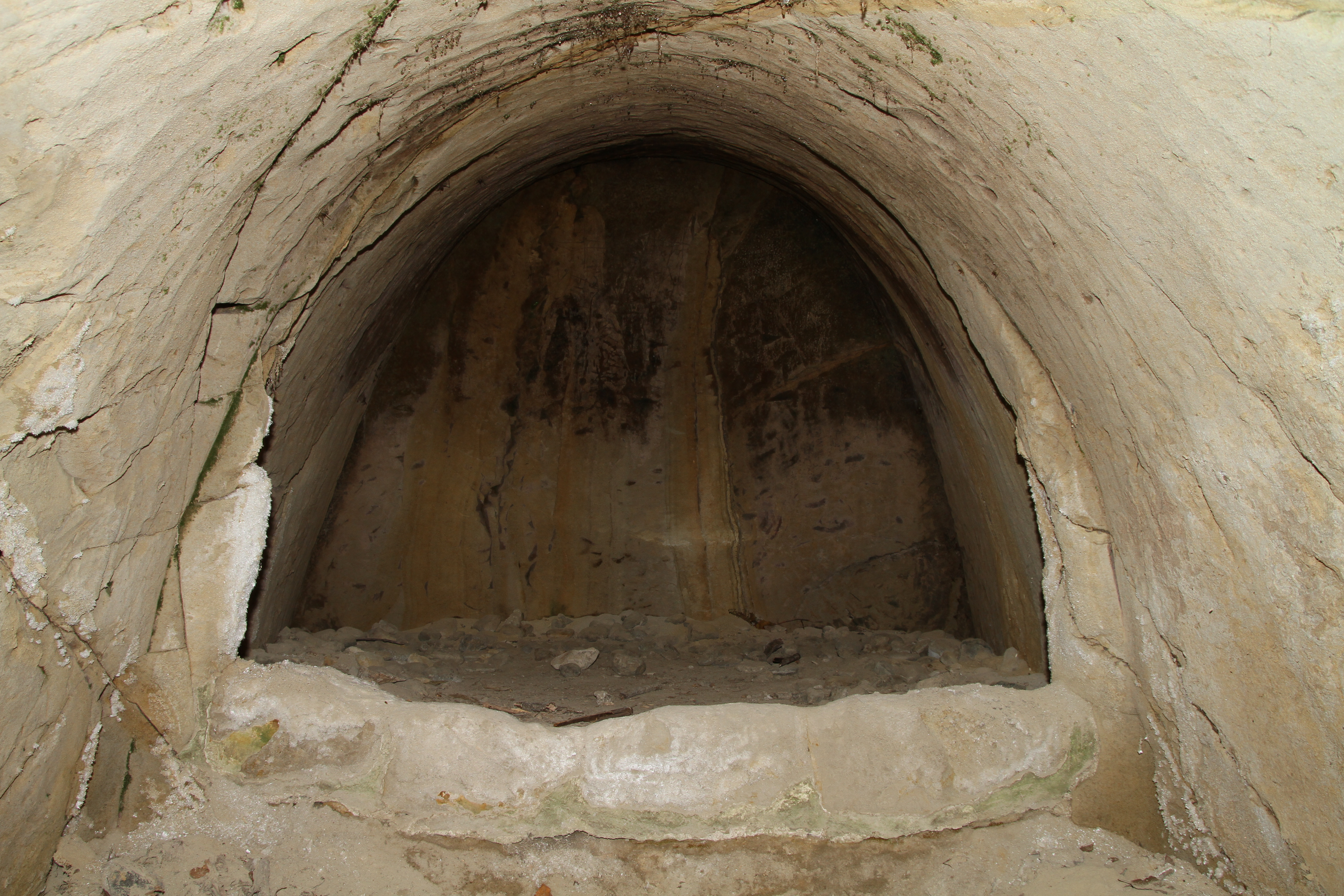
Interior of Tomb A-8

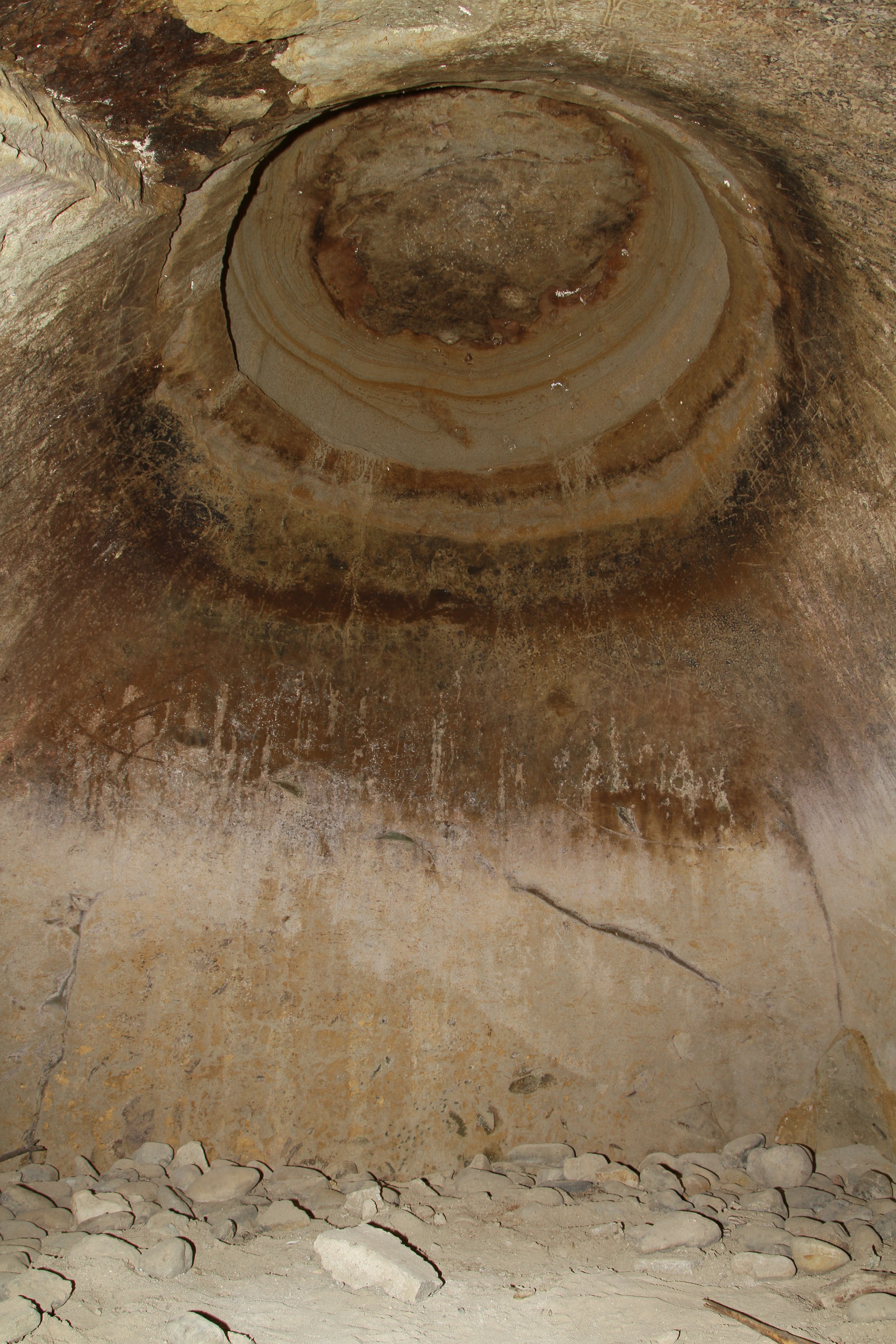
Interior of Tomb A-9

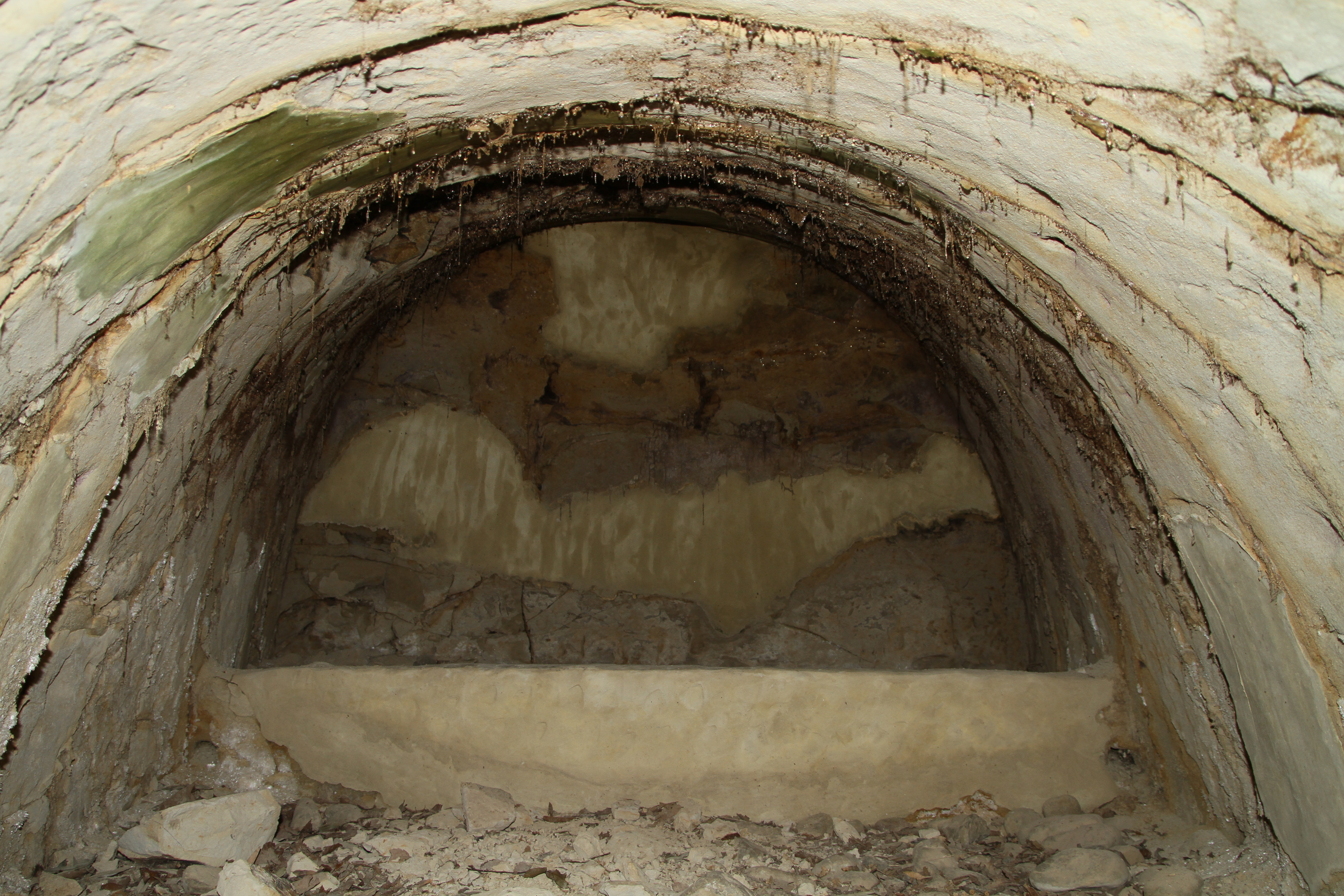
Interior of Cave Tomb B2

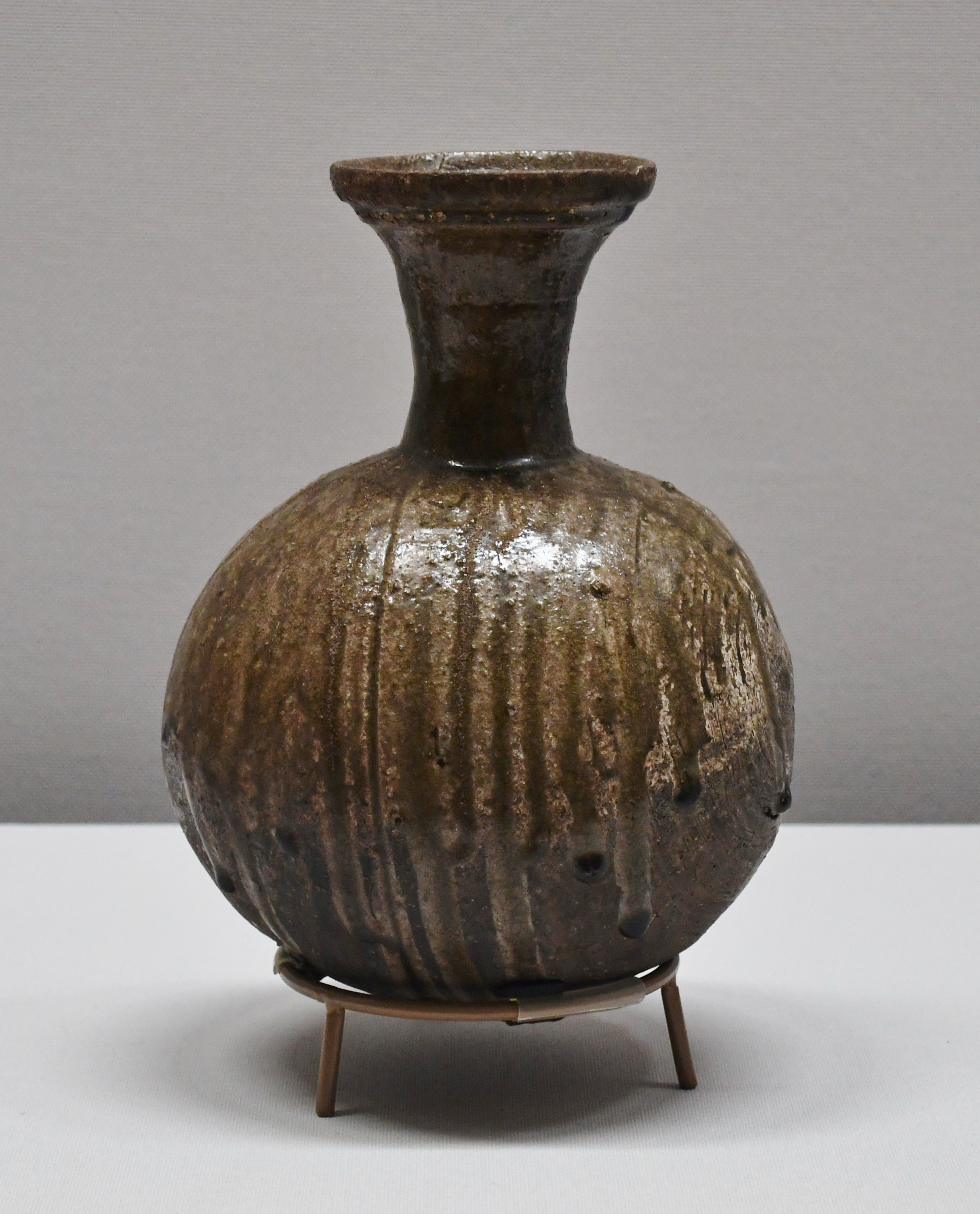
Sue Ware Flask-shaped Long-necked Bottle
Tokyo National Museum Exhibition.

The site is approximately 800 meters north of Ichigao Station on the Tokyu Den-en-toshi Line.

== See also ==
- List of Historic Sites of Japan (Kanagawa)
