= Inarimae Kofun Cluster =

Kofun period burial mound cluster in Yokohama, Japan

Inarizuka Kofun cluster
- 稲荷前古墳群 (Japanese)
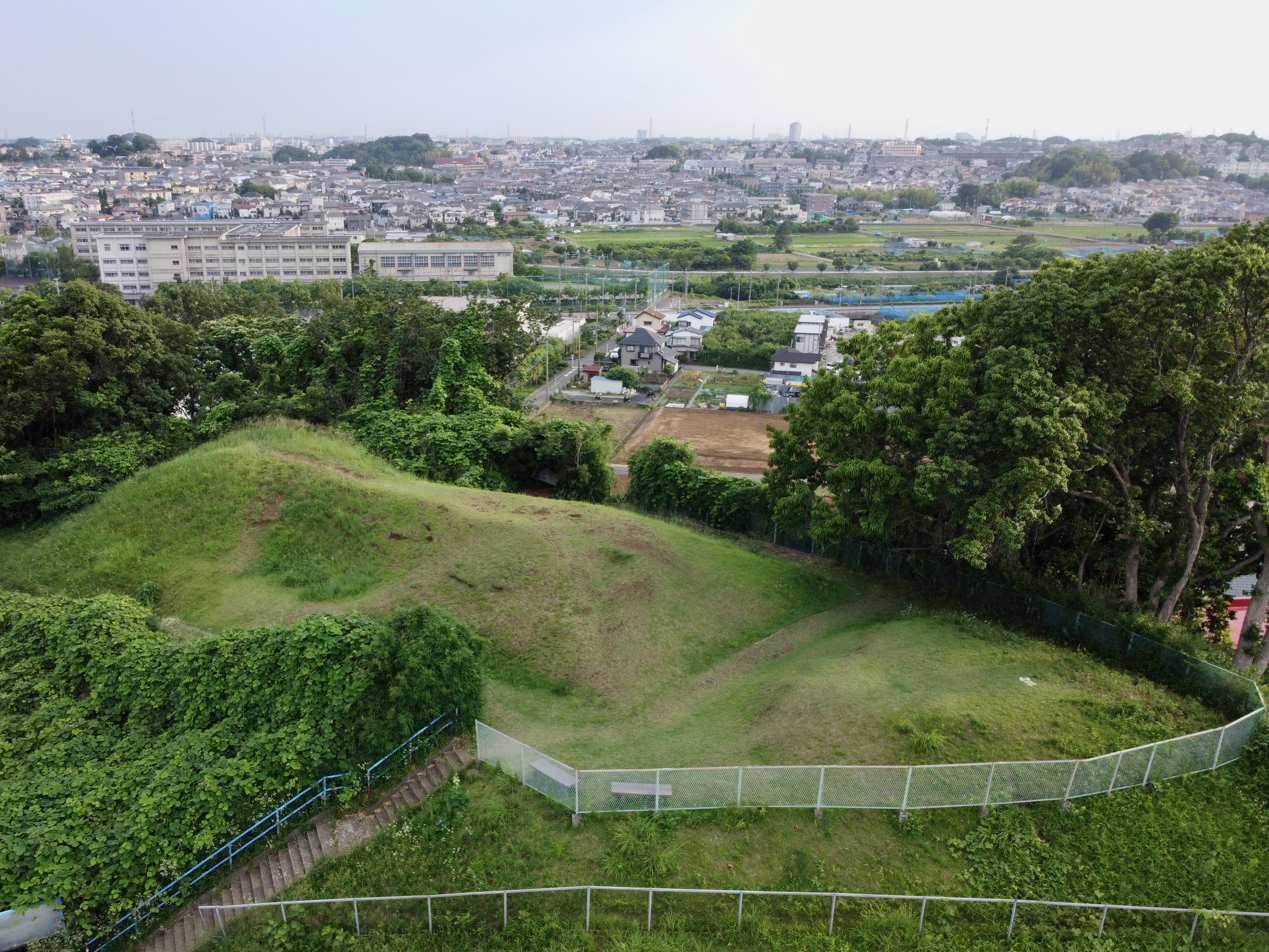
- Inarizuka Kofun cluster

- Inarizuka Kofun cluster Inarimae Kofun Cluster (Japan)
- 35°33′34.66″N 139°31′54.94″E
- Type: Kofun
- Periods: Kofun period
- Location: 156-10 Oba-cho, Aoba-ku, Yokohama City, Kanagawa
- Region: Kantō region

History
- Built: late 6th century

Site notes
- Public access: Yes (park)
- Kanagawa Prefecture Historic Site

Red text indicates extinct burial mounds. Blue text indicates existing burial mounds.

The Inarizuka Kofun cluster (稲荷前古墳群) is a group of Kofun period burial mound, located in the Ōba-chō neighborhood of Aoba-ku, Yokohama, Kanagawa Prefecture in the Kantō region of Japan. The tumulus cluster was designated a Kanagawa Prefecture Historic Site in 1970.

== Overview ==
Inarizuka Kofun cluster is a dense concentration of various types of burial mounds located on a hill overlooking the Tsurumi River. From the 4th to the 7th centuries during the Kofun period, powerful chieftains ruled the Tsuzuki region, which stretched along the Tanimoto River (Tsurumi River) basin, and maintained ties with the Yamato regime. In Ichigao-cho, in addition to the Inarimae Kofun cluster, many other burial mounds and cave tombs have been discovered, including the Asakojihara Kofun Group and the Ichigao Yokoana Kofun Cluster. These burial mounds are the tombs of successive chieftains and their families who ruled this region.

In 1965, amidst the wave of rapid economic growth, the Kohoku New Town plan, one of Yokohama City's six major urban development projects, was announced, and in 1966, the Den-en-toshi Line opened, and the mountainous areas of northern Yokohama began undergoing large-scale development into residential areas. Although the Inarimae Kofun cluster is not located in the Kohoku New Town area, its proximity to the Den-en-toshi Line led residential development, and it was discovered on June 15, 1967, during the construction of this residential area. A rescue archeology excavation and surveys were conducted inn August 1967 and from February 20 to March 31, 1969. As a result, a total of ten burial mounds were found: two zenpō-kōen-fun (前方後円墳) keyhole-shaped tumuli (Kofun 1 and 6), one zenhō-kōhō-fun (前方後方墳) conjoined square-shaped mound (Kofun 16), four enpun (円墳) circular mounds, and three hōfun (方墳) square mounds, along with nine horizontal-entry stone burial chambers, quiclky earning the site the nickname "Museum of Burial Mounds." The unique diversity of the site with so many different types of kofun in such a small area, sparked a preservation movement. However, then-Mayor Ichio Asukata, had a notable lack of enthusiasm for preservation. Furthermore, the Kofun No. 1 was physically difficult to preserve because its perimeter was eroded to the very edge during construction, creating a sheer cliff - a deliberate measure by the developers to force the abandonment of preservation. Ultimately, most of the site was destroyed and the area was converted into a residential area.

Evetually, only three kofun are preserved: the conjoined square Kofun No. 16 and the square Kofun No. 15 and 17.

The nearest station is Ichigao Station on the Tokyu Den-en-toshi Line.

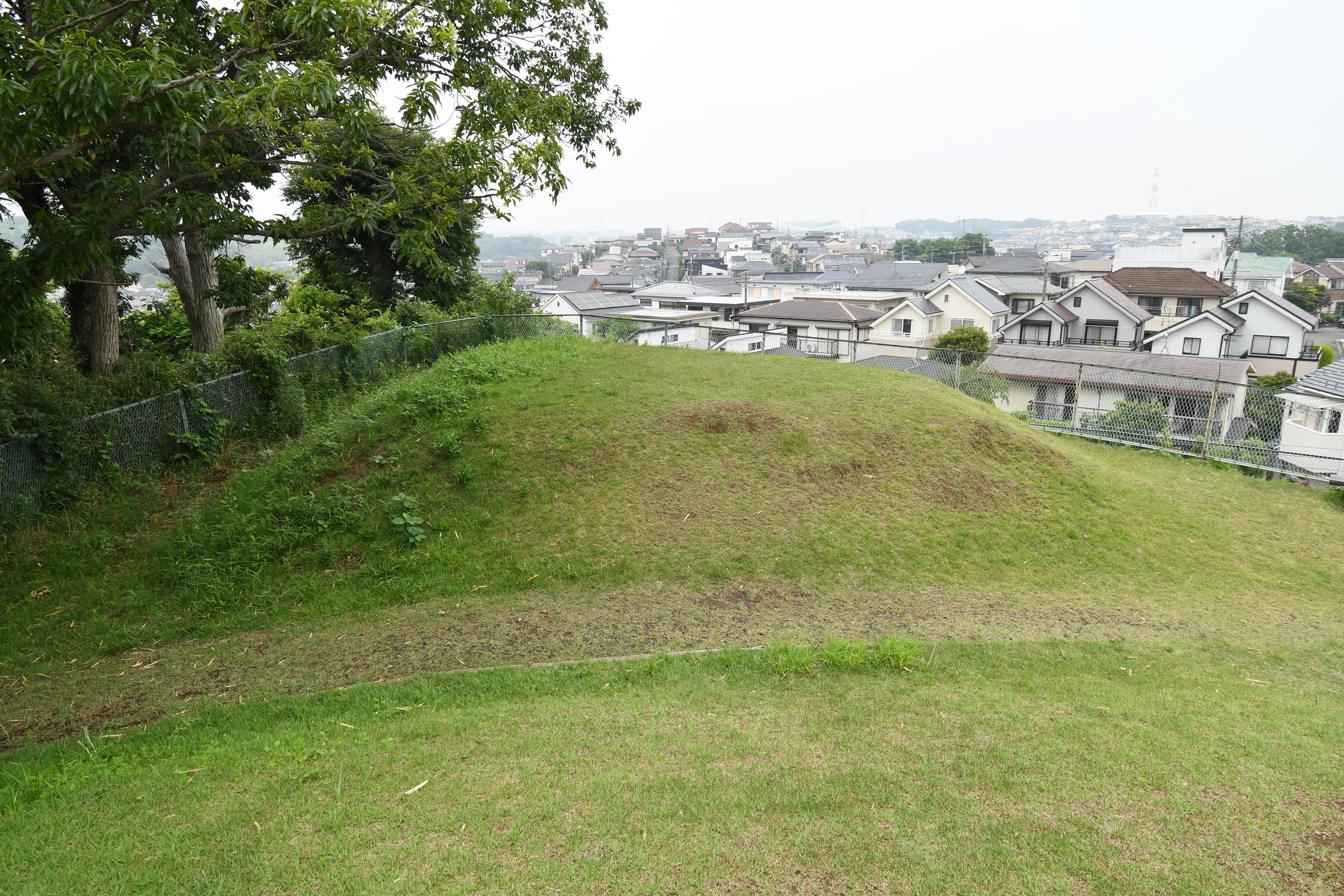
Kofun No.15

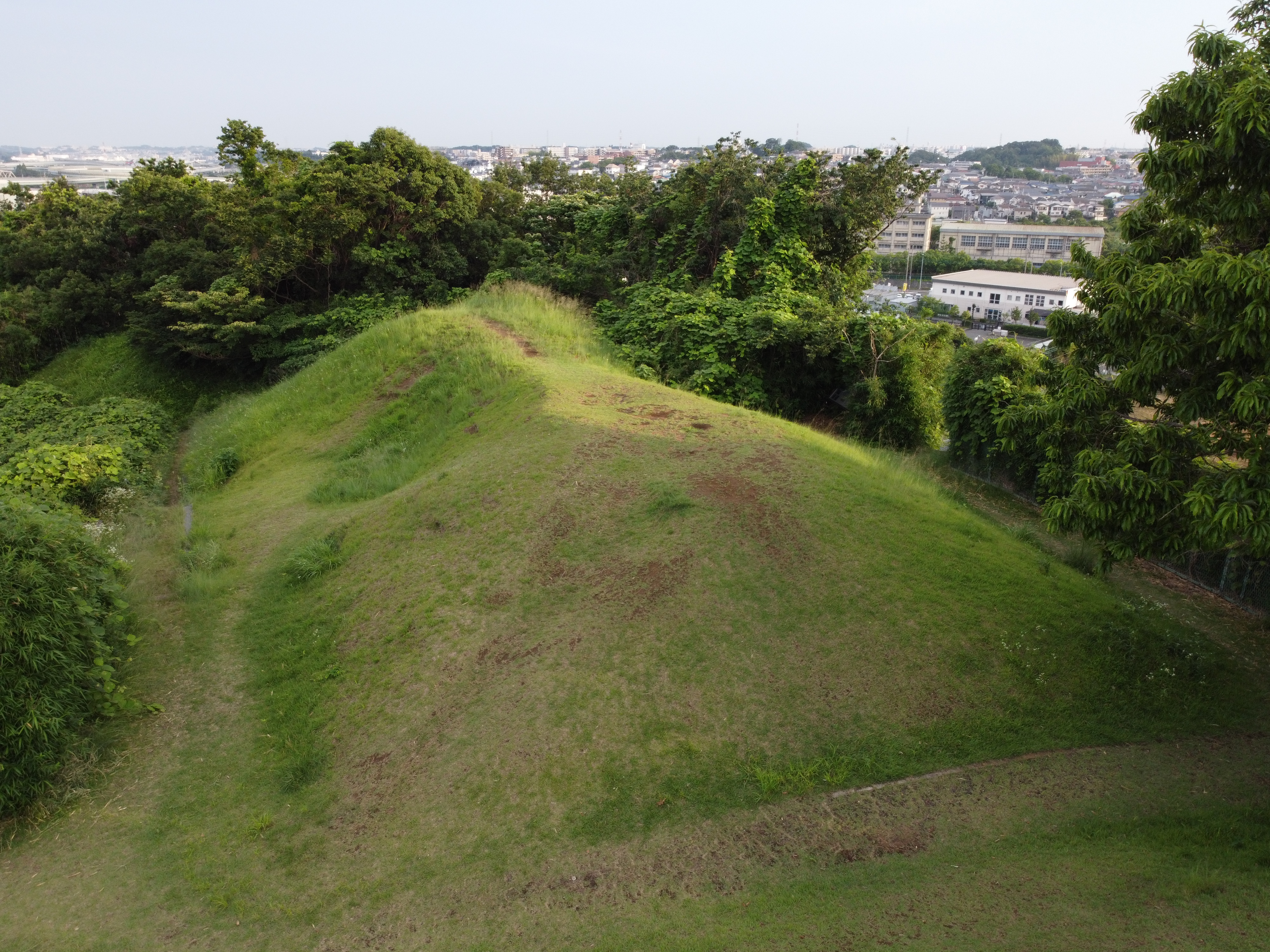
Kofun No.16

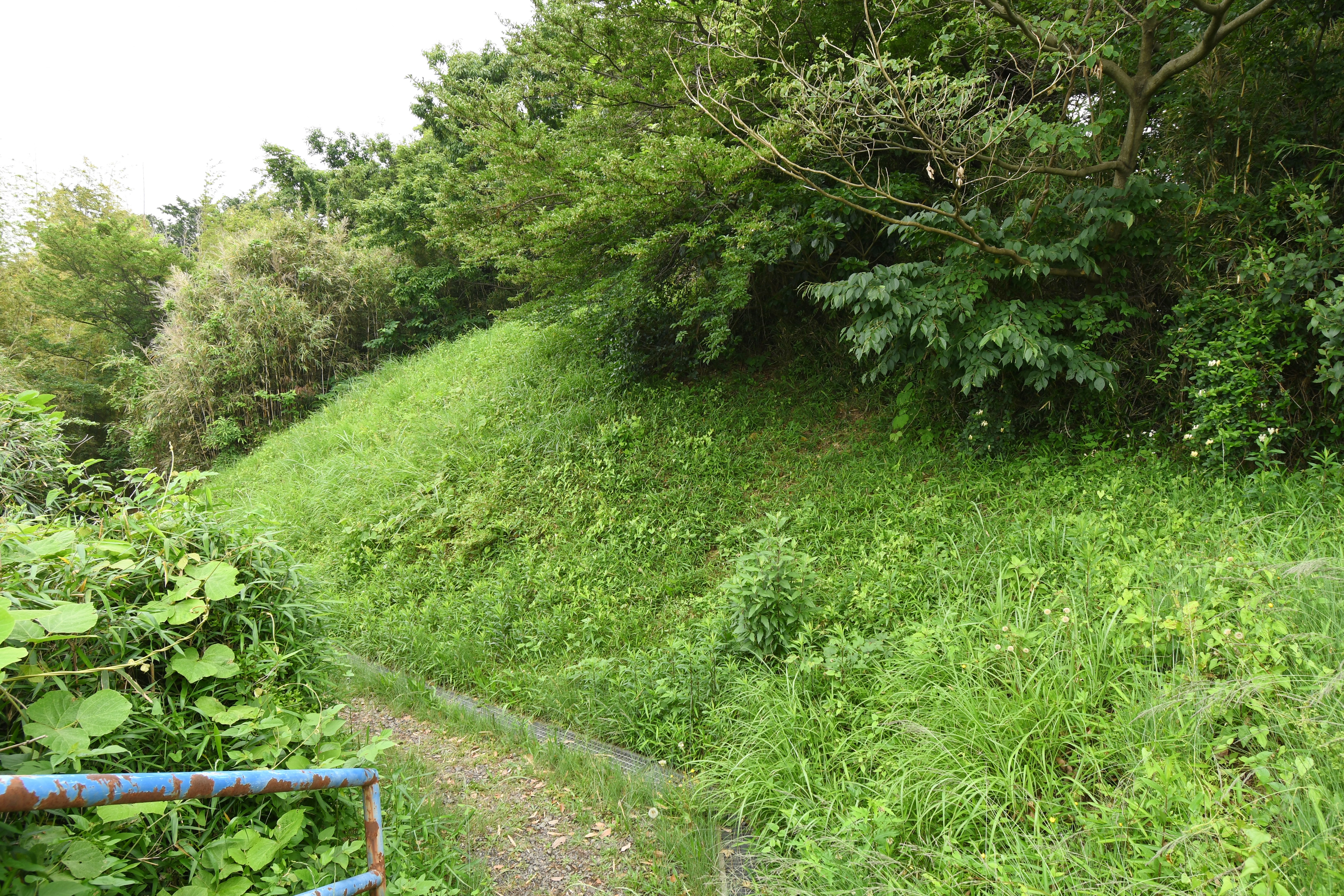
Kofun No.17

== See also ==
- List of Historic Sites of Japan (Kanagawa)
