= Samantha Fox Strip Poker =

1986 video game

- Developer: Software Communications
- Publisher: Martech
- Platforms: Amstrad CPC, BBC Micro, Commodore 64, MSX, ZX Spectrum
- Release: 1986
- Genres: Erotic, poker

Samantha Fox Strip Poker is a 1986 erotic video game developed by Software Communications and published by Martech. It was published on the Commodore 64, Amstrad CPC, BBC Micro, MSX, and ZX Spectrum.

== Gameplay ==
The players plays 5-card or 7-card stud poker against British model and singer Samantha Fox. Winning hands results in her taking off her clothes until she is topless.

== Reception ==
ZZap!64 felt the music was well-suited to the style of game. Commodore Format magazine thought that the idea of anybody using the game as a way to experience titillating content was depressing due to the required amount of effort from the player.

Uvejuegos thought the game was a prime example of how strange the 1980s were. Der Spiegel placed the game within the sub-genre of early pixelated digi-ladies of dubious beauty, along with Artworx's Strip Poker (1984).
