= Vigilante (video game) =

1988 video game

- North American arcade flyer
- Developer: Irem (Note: Master System version developed by Arc System Works; Amiga, Atari ST, Amstrad CPC, Commodore 64 and ZX Spectrum versions developed by Emerald Software; MSX version developed by Clover.)
- Publishers: Irem: Arcade; JP/EU: Irem; NA: Data East TurboGrafx-16; JP: Irem; NA: NEC Master System Sega Amiga, Atari ST, CPC, ZX Spectrum U.S. Gold C64; EU: U.S. Gold; NA: Data East MSX Clover
- Composer: Masato Ishizaki
- Platforms: Arcade, TurboGrafx-16, Master System, Amiga, Amstrad CPC, Atari ST, Commodore 64, ZX Spectrum, MSX
- Release: February 1988: Arcade; NA: February 1988; JP/EU: March 1988 TurboGrafx-16; JP: January 14, 1989; NA: October 1989 Master System; NA: May 1989; PAL: July 1989 Amiga, Atari ST, CPC, ZX Spectrum; EU: August 1989 C64; EU: August 1989; NA: January 1990 MSX; KOR: 1989
- Genre: Beat 'em up
- Mode: Single-player

Vigilante (Note: Japanese: ビジランテ, Hepburn: Bijirante) is a 1988 beat 'em up video game developed and published by Irem for arcades; it was released in North America by Data East. It is considered a spiritual sequel to Irem's earlier Kung-Fu Master (1984).

== Plot ==
Set in downtown New York City, the game's plot involves a lone, professional martial artist who becomes a vigilante to fight an evil gang called the Skinheads, ruled by a man known as the Giant Devil, in order to protect his "turf" and save a female hostage named Madonna, who was kidnapped by them.

== Gameplay ==
Arcade version

Players control the titular character using punches and kicks to defeat the Skinheads in a 2D platform manner, while sometimes picking up and using nunchaku against them. If players get hurt while holding nunchuku, they become unarmed. There are five stages in order of appearance: a street, a junkyard, the Brooklyn Bridge, a back street scene and on top of a building that is under construction. Skinheads with Mohawk or spiked hairdo attack the vigilante with knives, chains, motorbikes, guns and other kinds of weapons. They will also choke him if he lets them get too close.

== Development ==
An arcade sequel to Kung-Fu Master called Beyond Kung-Fu: Return of the Master was developed by Irem and underwent location testing in 1987, but was shelved after it underperformed. The Kung-Fu sequel was then revamped into Vigilante, after Irem decided to give the game a more Americanized setting, which was released in 1988.

== Ports ==
The arcade game was later ported to several different home computers and consoles. A Master System version developed by Arc System Works was released exclusively in North America and Europe by Sega, and is one of several games in the console to include an FM sound switch for enhanced music quality. In the Master System version, Madonna was renamed "Maria" and the Skinheads were called the "Rogues".

Ports to the Commodore 64, ZX Spectrum, Atari ST, Amiga and the Amstrad CPC were reprogrammed by Emerald Software and published by U.S. Gold mostly in Europe. The MSX version was ported and published by Korean company Clover.

The TurboGrafx-16 version was ported and published in Japan on January 14, 1989 by Irem and published in North America by NEC in October of that year. This port matches the arcade more than other ports. The TurboGrafx-16 version was later re-released globally for the Virtual Console service for the Wii in February 2007 for North America, Japan, and Europe, with the exception of Australia on July 6, but was delisted in March 2012 before it returned in September 2013. It was also released for the Wii U's Virtual Console in Japan on February 10, 2015, in North America on September 14, 2017 and in Europe on October 5. Hamster Corporation released the arcade version as part of the Arcade Archives series for the Nintendo Switch and PlayStation 4 in 2019.

== Reception ==
Reception

Review scores
Publication	Score			
Publication	Arcade	Master System	TurboGrafx-16	ZX
Crash				8/10
Computer and Video Games		80%	80%	
PC Engine Fan			19.32/30	
Sinclair User				6/10
Your Sinclair	8/10			69%
Zero		84%		
Computer Entertainer		6/8 stars		

In Japan, Game Machine listed Vigilante as the second most successful table arcade unit of April 1988.

Your Sinclair gave the arcade game a positive review, stating it was "a pretty good game" with "loads" of enemies, "crunchingly realistic" sound effects, "beautifully detailed" sprite graphics and "really smooth" movement animation. They later described the ZX Spectrum version as a "pretty standard beat 'em up" that "you've probably seen" before, saying players should "only buy if you're addicted to the genre and you've already got the better ones".

Computer and Video Games gave the PC Engine version a positive review, stating it was "a good game, even second time" around, the graphics are "perfectly defined and beautifully" animated, and that "any beat 'em up fan should check out Vigilante without delay".
