= Eddie Kidd Jump Challenge =

1984 video game

- Publisher: Martech
- Platforms: Acorn Electron, BBC Micro, Commodore 64, MSX, ZX Spectrum
- Release: 1984
- Genre: Sports
- Mode: Single-player

Eddie Kidd Jump Challenge is a stunt bike video game released for the Acorn Electron, BBC Micro, Commodore 64, MSX and ZX Spectrum first released in 1984, licensed by British stunt performer, Eddie Kidd.

== Gameplay ==
Acorn Electron screenshot showing a motorbike jump over cars.

The player takes the role of Eddie Kidd and must make a series of jumps. Like the real Kidd, the player must start by jumping a BMX over oil barrels and work up to jumping cars on a motorbike.

The player starts by riding away from the jump to get a big enough run up. They then must set the correct speed, correctly selecting gears, to hit the ramp with enough speed to clear the obstacles but not too much to miss the landing ramp. While in the air, the player can lean forward or back to land correctly.

== Development and release ==
The game was first released in late 1984 for the ZX Spectrum published by Software Communications' Martech label. This version was ported to the MSX in 1985. A similar version was released for the BBC Micro and Acorn Electron and a modified version of the game (with a much more zoomed in camera angle and no on screen display) released for the Commodore 64, also in 1985.

The game cassette came with a sticker and numbered competition entry card which could be used to win prizes including BMX bikes, computers and TVs.

The game was reissued at a budget price as part of Mastertronic's Ricochet label in 1987.

== Reception ==
Crash gave the game an overall score of 56% concluding it is "a good simulation, but as a game not over exciting and not particularly addictive". The difficulty curve was criticised with the early BMX-based levels, which can not be skipped, described as "a doddle" and once the skill has been mastered, the game holds no challenge. Clare Edgeley of Sinclair User agreed that having to replay the BMX section after failing the more advanced jumps "seems a waste of time" and gave a similar score of 6/10. Computer and Video Games gave scores between 7/10 and 8/10, particularly praising the zoomed in graphics and improved sound of the Commodore 64 version calling them "superb - outshining the Spectrum game by miles".
