= The Fury (video game) =

1988 video game

- Developer: Creative Reality
- Publisher: Martech Games
- Platforms: Amstrad CPC, ZX Spectrum, Commodore 64
- Release: 1988
- Genre: Racing
- Modes: Single-player, multiplayer

The Fury is a racing video game. It was developed by Creative Reality and published by Martech Games. It was released for the Amstrad CPC, Commodore 64, and ZX Spectrum in 1988. The box art was illustrated by Rodney Matthews.

The game received mixed to negative reviews.

== Plot ==
Loading screen

The Fury is a racing game set in the year 2045AD on the artificial planet Devs. Racing on a gutter shaped track orbiting the planet, racers race for money. The races are broadcast by The Network, a television station that also sponsor the races and train the racers. During these races, some of the drivers disappear while racing at top speed. One driver, after reappearing, explained it by saying "It's The Fury..."

== Gameplay ==
The player must qualify in each race through different objectives. Qualifications of races range from speed trials, to killing a certain amount of "Nids", or young unqualified racers. Another type of race is the Tag Races, a race version of tag. Completing these tasks rewards the player money, where they can spend on new vehicles, car repairs, missiles and flamethrowers, fuel, and escape pods that can eject the player from their car to avoid danger.

== Reception ==
Reception

Review scores
Publication	Score
ACE	321/1000
Crash	72%
Computer and Video Games	3/10
Sinclair User	69/100
Your Sinclair	8/10
Zzap!64	52%
The Games Machine	57% (Spectrum); 53% (Amstrad)

The Fury received mixed to negative reviews. Sinclair User's Chris Jenkins described as an "initially interesting, but ultimately unsatisfying space race". Andy Smith from ACE panned the game, criticizing its graphic and calling its concept "old hat". Matt Bielby for Computer and Video Games was also unimpressed by the graphics, noting the parallax scrolling failing to give the impression of speed.

In addition to the poor reviews, the game did not sell well.
