= The Running Man (video game) =

1989 video game

- Developer: Emerald Software
- Publisher: Grandslam Entertainments
- Platforms: Amiga; Amstrad CPC; Atari ST; Commodore 64; ZX Spectrum
- Release: EU: 1989
- Genre: Beat 'em up
- Mode: Single-player

The Running Man is a 1989 beat 'em up video game based on the 1987 film of the same name. It was developed by Emerald Software and published by Grandslam Entertainments for Amiga, Amstrad CPC, Atari ST, Commodore 64, and ZX Spectrum.

== Gameplay ==
The Running Man is a side-scrolling beat 'em up game based on the 1987 film of the same name. Set in Los Angeles in 2019, the player takes control of former policeman Ben Richards, who was framed for the murder of innocent civilians. He is chosen by host Damon Killian to compete for his survival on the television game show known as The Running Man. The player can crawl, kick, and run. The game is played across five levels, each one featuring a primary enemy. The first four enemies are "stalkers", who are tasked with killing Richards. As in the film, the stalkers include Subzero, Buzzsaw, Dynamo, and Fireball. The final enemy is Killian, who is confronted by Richards in the TV studio. Other enemies throughout the game include dogs and guards. Energy can be regained by kicking the dogs. In between levels is a time-limited puzzle game, which restores full energy if it is solved. The puzzle game presents two images side by side, with the left one being jumbled. The player is tasked with arranging the image on the left side to match the image shown on the right.

== Development and release ==
The Running Man was developed by Emerald Software and published by Grandslam Entertainments. The game includes an introduction sequence that makes use of digitized images. The sequence is set before Richards starts The Running Man as he tells Killian "I'll be back", suggesting he will succeed in surviving the game. The Amiga version of the game was released as a two-disk set, with the introduction sequence getting its own disk of the two. For the ZX Spectrum version, each character has a minimum of 20 frames, and some use up to 30; to overcome memory constraints, special encoding methods were used. The game was released in Europe in 1989, for Amiga, Amstrad CPC, Atari ST, Commodore 64 (C64), and ZX Spectrum.

The programmers included Fran Heeran, Mark Cushen, Bobby Healy and Jonathan Broggy.

== Reception ==
Reception

Review scores
Publication	Score
Crash	80% (ZX Spectrum)
Computer and Video Games	47% (Amiga)
Sinclair User	74/100 (ZX Spectrum)
Your Sinclair	90/100 (ZX Spectrum)
Zzap!64	40% (Amiga); 44% (C64)
Commodore User	79% (Amiga)
The Games Machine	53% (Amiga); 51% (Atari ST); 60% (ZX Spectrum)
Power Play	31/100 (Amiga)
ST/Amiga Format	73% (Amiga)

Award
Publication	Award
Your Sinclair	YS Megagame

Tony Dillon of Commodore User wrote that the game "is fun for a while", but considered it an average beat em' up. Julian Rignall of Computer and Video Games also considered it "a barely average beat 'em up", expressing disappointment with the game considering its film license. Gordon Hamlett of Your Amiga considered it a "substandard" beat 'em up, while Zzap!64 wrote that the game consisted of repetitive beat-'em up action with few moves to choose from.

Crash praised the game and considered it to be a good film tie-in, while mentioning its difficulty, particularly during the puzzle aspect. Mark Higham of ST/Amiga Format said that because the game has only five levels, the game has "ridiculously" hard difficulty and short length. Rignall also criticized the difficulty, saying that it goes as relatively easy at the start and later through much more difficult levels and opponents, resulting in frustration and annoyance. Hamlett wrote that when a dog knocks the player down and inflicts damage, there is a fair chance that it will turn and do the same again before the players have a chance to respond. Some were critical that only a small portion of the screen is used for gameplay.

The graphics received some praise, along with the sound. The game's introduction sequence was mostly praised. Dillon wrote that it was the most impressive part of the game. Rignall considered the sequence to be among the best he had seen on a computer, but was negative to the graphics overall. Zzap!64 criticized the game's "dull" graphics and gameplay, but praised the intro sequence. Higham felt that the graphics and gameplay speed needed improvement; although praising intro sequence with sampled music and digitised images, he concluded that those features are not enough to recommend this game.

Several critics disliked the controls and sluggish gameplay. Reviewing the Amiga version, The Games Machine wrote that the game has frustrating gameplay and poor controls. The Games Machine later wrote that the Atari ST version plays just as badly as the Amiga game. The magazine wrote that the ZX Spectrum version had slightly improved control but negatively noted that it was still the same basic game. Hamlett criticized the Amiga version for its poor joystick response. Zzap!64 stated that the C64 version had slightly better playability than the Amiga version but that it was just as sluggish.
