= Rex (video game) =

1988 shoot 'em up video game

- Developer: The Light
- Publisher: Martech
- Programmers: Neil Harris; John Anderson
- Artist: Richard Allen
- Platforms: ZX Spectrum, Amstrad CPC
- Release: 1988
- Genre: Action-adventure
- Mode: Single-player

Rex is an action-adventure shoot 'em up video game similar to Metroid that was published by Martech in 1988 for the ZX Spectrum and Amstrad CPC.

== Gameplay ==
ZX Spectrum gameplay

The player controls Rex, a "rino-sapien" mercenary, hired to eliminate the humans that have built a Great Tower in a place called Zenith. Action takes place in a flip-screen cavern complex. Rex can jump, shoot and activate a shield to block incoming attacks. Enemies include fixed gun turrets and human soldiers; shooting the latter initiates a 'multi recoil system' in which the defeated soldier's body continues to recoil until the player's bullets stop hitting it. Destroyed enemies leave behind Energy Bubbles, which can be used to upgrade Rex's weapon.

== Development ==
Rex was developed by a programming team consisting of Neil Harris, Richard Allen and John Anderson. After working for IBM, they all left to form The Light, choosing the Z80 as their development platform. Neil and John were coders, whilst Richard worked on graphics. Rex was the only game they developed.

In issue 112 of Retro Gamer Magazine, coder Jas Austin revealed that Creative Reality, authors of several titles for Martech Games, were the actual creators of Rex. They devised the pseudonym The Light because their previous game had been a commercial failure. John Anderson was Jas Austin, Neil Harris was Neil Dodwell and Richard Allen, Dave Dew. This was Creative Reality's last 8-bit game, but they continued into the 90's with PC games such as Martian Gothic and Dreamweb.

== Reception ==
Reception

Award
Publication	Award
Your Sinclair	YS Megagame

Rex was a critical success, with Your Sinclair awarding 9 out of 10, CRASH awarded 82% and Sinclair User awarded 88%. The difficulty of Rex is highlighted, drawing comparisons with Cybernoid, but reviewers were also impressed with the intricate graphics and level of action.
