= Global Commander =

1987 video game

- Developer: Martech
- Publishers: Martech, Datasoft
- Platforms: Amiga, Amstrad CPC, Atari ST, Commodore 64, ZX Spectrum
- Release: NA: 1987
- Genre: Real-time strategy
- Mode: Single-player

Global Commander (known as The Armageddon Man in Europe) is a computer game developed by Martech in 1987 for the Amiga, Amstrad CPC, Atari ST, Commodore 64, and ZX Spectrum.

== Gameplay ==
Global Commander is a game in which the player must prevent conflict between the 16 nations of the U.N.N., each with its own level of technology and natural resources. The player's nation can use laser-defense satellites to stop missile attacks launched between nations, as well as three reconnaissance satellites to track military activity. The player receives memos when one nation makes a demand of another, and the player is also able to scan radio frequencies to detect coded messages.

== Reception ==
Computer Gaming World criticized Global Commander's music and lack of a save option. It concluded that "the game can be entertaining, but overall, the inconveniences may outweigh the advantages". A 1992 survey in the magazine of wargames with modern settings gave the game two stars out of five, stating that "it bears little resemblance to reality and has limited entertainment value", and a 1994 survey gave it one star. The game was reviewed in 1988 in Dragon #140 by Hartley, Patricia, and Kirk Lesser in "The Role of Computers" column. The reviewers gave the game 4 out of 5 stars.
