= Vixen (video game) =

1988 video game

- Publisher: Martech
- Programmers: Ian McArdle; Jonathan Howell; Nick Jones
- Artists: Malcolm J. Smith; Mark Eason
- Composer: Jason C. Brooke
- Platforms: Amiga, Amstrad CPC, Atari ST, Commodore 64, MS-DOS, ZX Spectrum
- Release: 1988
- Genre: Platform
- Mode: Single-player

Vixen is a platform game published by Martech in 1988 for the Amiga, Amstrad CPC, Atari ST, Commodore 64, MS-DOS, and ZX Spectrum.

== Plot ==
Vixen is the last human on the planet Granath, which is now ruled by a race of dinosaurs. Abandoned as a child and raised by magical foxes, she intends to follow through on a promise she made to her elders to wipe the dinosaurs out and restore the planet to humanity.

== Gameplay ==
Vixen was based unofficially on the Tecmo arcade game Rygar. Each level must be completed within a time limit, by progressing from left to right. The player's character is armed only with a whip, used to defeat enemies and to collect bonus items such as gems (for points), extra lives and time. The player's character can also collect fox head tokens. If enough are collected by the end of the level, she will transform into a fox, allowing the player to enter a special underground lair. Here she can collect gems, mega gems (which increase scoring potential above ground) and weapon upgrades (to increase the power of her whip). A notable feature in the game was that it used an early form of motion capture to generate the animation for the main character making it far more realistic than usual for a computer game of that era.

== Reception ==
The various versions of Vixen received a wide range of review scores. ACE gave it a score of 452/1000 saying it had "nothing original to offer". Computer & Video Games, praised the graphics, particularly on the Atari ST, but criticised the playability. The Games Machine rated the game from 42% for the "barely adequate" Amstrad version to 72% for the PC version. Your Sinclair awarded the game 6/10 stating that while the animation of the main character was superb, "the rest of the graphics suck".

The cover of the game, featuring Page Three girl Corinne Russell in the guise of the Vixen, caused controversy and high-street chain Boots refused to stock the game until Martech reissued the game with a less provocative cover. The May 1988 issue of Your Sinclair featured a similar image on the front page which was equally controversial and attracted a number of complaints.
