= Zoids: The Battle Begins =

1986 video game

- Developer: Electronic Pencil Company
- Publisher: Martech
- Producer: David Martin
- Designer: Chris Fayers
- Platforms: Amstrad CPC, Commodore 64, ZX Spectrum, MSX
- Release: 1986
- Genre: Shoot 'em up
- Mode: Single-player

Zoids: The Battle Begins is a 1986 video game designed by Chris Fayers, developed by the Electric Pencil Company, and published by Martech. and released in Europe for the ZX Spectrum, Amstrad CPC, MSX and Commodore 64 computers. Based on the Zoids toy series, the player controls a human who was fused with one of the robots and has to reclaim parts of a larger mech.

Upon release, Zoids received positive reception from video game critics.

== Gameplay ==
Gameplay of Zoids: The Battle Begins (Amstrad CPC screenshot)

Players control a human who has fused with a machine known as a Spiderzoid; this human has been tasked with reclaiming the six parts of a large machine named Zoidzilla. These parts have been captured by the enemy Red Zoids, each part reclaimed will boost the power of the player's Spiderzoid.

== Development ==
Zoids: The Battle Begins was published by Martech and developed by the Electric Pencil Company, having previously made The Fourth Protocol in 1985. The game was produced by David Martin, with Chris Fayers being the game designer.

== Reception ==
Reception

Review scores
Publication	Score
Amtix	93%
Crash	96%
Computer and Video Games	31/40
Sinclair User	4/5
Your Sinclair	9/10%
Zzap!64	96%
Computer Gamer	17/20

Award
Publication	Award
Crash	Smash

Zoids: The Battle Begins received generally positive reception from video game critics. Reviewers for Amtix praised the game, with one writer considered it to be one of the best on the Amstrad. A writer for Crash gave positive marks for its graphics and gameplay and called it one of the best titles on the ZX Spectrum.
