= Martech =

Video game publisher (1982–1989)

- Industry: Video games
- Founded: 1982
- Fate: Stopped publishing video games in 1989
- Headquarters: Pevensey Bay, UK
- Key people: David Martin, John Barry, Ian McArdle
- Products: Brian Jacks SuperStar Challenge; Eddie Kidd Jump Challenge; Samantha Fox Strip Poker

Martech was a British video game publisher which operated in Pevensey Bay between 1982 and 1989. It was founded as Martech Games. The company published a number of successful video games for the BBC Model B, ZX Spectrum, ZX81, MSX, Amstrad CPC, Commodore 16, Commodore 64, Atari ST, and Amiga.

Martech was an early entrant into license-based games, signing deals with personalities such as Eddie Kidd, Geoff Capes, Brian Jacks, Samantha Fox, Nigel Mansell, toy endorsed games, such as Zoids, book/comic characters, such as Tarzan and Slaine, and movies, such as Jaws. The company won several industry awards for innovative game design and marketing campaigns.

In the late 1980s the company embarked on an ambitious program of expansion by opening two games development studios, one in Brighton and one in Waterford, Ireland. In 1989 a number of critical development delays in both new studios led to the closure of the company.

== History ==
Martech Games was formed in 1982 by David Martin and John Barry, who had met whilst studying at the University of Surrey.

In 1982 David, at that time a Head of Science and Chemistry Teacher, purchased a BBC Model B microcomputer for his department and began to develop early educational programs. When the ZX81 was released David purchased one, together with the infamous wobbly 16K RAM pack, and began to program games at home. This hobby eventually led to the development of a computer moderated board game called Conflict, which David manufactured at home, with help from John Barry, and sold to early computer game outlets under the brand name Martech. When the ZX Spectrum was released David ported the game to the new platform, whilst also completing the development of a second game, Galaxy Conflict. Around this time David heard that WH Smith were beginning to sell early video games, and he made a trip to see the buyer who placed a big order for Conflict. Sales in other outlets were taking off too. David decided to quit teaching in December 1983 and concentrate on building the embryonic business. John Barry, who had recently established his own solicitors practice Barry & Co in Pevensey Bay, became a partner in the new business.

Looking for investment, David and John had a series of meetings with a firm of exporters, British Overseas and Export Trading based in Brighton and London. This led to the formation of Software Communications Ltd, with Martech becoming the trading name of a new publishing company headquartered on the second floor of Barry & Co's offices.

When David was not able to further his coding skills due to the managerial demands of the company, new games were sought from freelance programmers, beginning with David Wainwright, who had created the adventure game Quest of Merravid for the BBC B. The company also negotiated a distribution agreement for several games from a new software development company, Durell Software. Games distributed for Durell included chart hits Jungle Trouble, Harrier Attack and Scuba Dive.

In 1983 Martech contracted freelance programmer Ian McArdle (who stayed with Martech to work on several games) to work on a new motorbike stunt game. Looking for a marketing edge, Martin negotiated to have well-known personality Eddie Kidd endorse the game under the title Eddie Kidd Jump Challenge, thus making Martech one of the first publishers to use a licensed endorsement on a video game. Due to its success, other personality endorsed games were developed over the next few years, including Brian Jacks for Brian Jacks SuperStar Challenge and Uchi Mata, Geoff Capes for Geoff Capes Strongman, model and singer Samantha Fox for Samantha Fox Strip Poker, and Nigel Mansell for Nigel Mansell's Grand Prix.

Other programmers and artists joined Ian McArdle to work on the above games on the ZX Spectrum and Amstrad CPC, and eventually Ian, John Edginton and Graphic Designer Malcom Smith, plus others, were set up in an office Martech rented on Brighton's Old Steine. David Wainwright produced further games for Martech in his own studio in Partsmouth, as did leading freelance games developers, such as Chris Fayers and Simon Nicol, emerging development teams, such as Creative Reality and The Electronic Pencil Company, plus many others.

Martech extended its range of games beyond 'personalities' when it signed the rights to develop a range of games based on the toy Zoids for Zoids - the Battle Begins, the game becoming one of its most successful chart hits that claimed several media and industry awards. Leading book, comic and movie character Tarzan followed for a Tarzan video game, as well as two games based on leading 2000 AD comic characters, Slaine and Nemesis the Warlock.

Martech also began to produce more games that were not built around a third party property, such as W.A.R., Mega-Apocalypse, Vixen and Rex.

In 1988, David Martin and John Barry, together with Mike Dixon, established a major new games development studio called Emerald Software in Waterford, Ireland. The first Martech branded game to emerge from this new studio was Phantom Fighter. Emerald also created a number of games for third-party publishers, such as The Deep and Michael Jackson's Moonwalker. Martech also launched a second label called Screen 7 which published, amongst others, a game based on the major movie franchise Jaws.

In 1989, critical development delays in both the Brighton and Waterford studios led to a severe cash flow crisis from which the company was not able to recover and it closed all operations in 1989.

David Martin accepted the role of Marketing Director at expanding Sheffield based games publisher Gremlin Interactive. He left to establish his own games businesses once more in 1994, one of which was purchased in 2000 by Liverpool based Rage Games plc, with Martin becoming the companies Licensing Director. Martin left the video games industry in 2005 to focus on non-game related businesses.

John Barry continues to run his own solicitors practice of Barry & Co in Pevensey Bay, East Sussex.

Many of the programmers, artists and games designers who worked with Martech went on to separate careers in the video games industry.

== Selected list of games ==
As Martech:

- Conflict (1982) – based on the boardgame Conflict
- Blastermind! (1983)
- Eddie Kidd Jump Challenge (1984)
- Geoff Capes Strong Man (1984)
- The Quest of Merravid
- Brian Jacks Superstar Challenge (1985)
- Crazy Comets (1985)
- The Living Body (1986)
- Tarzan (1986)
- Zoids - the Battle Begins (1986)
- W.A.R. (1986)
- Uchi Mata (1986)
- The Planets (1986)
- Samantha Fox Strip Poker (1986)
- Mega Apocalypse (1987) - clone of Gottlieb's Mad Planets
- The Armageddon Man (1987)
- Catch 23 (1987)
- Nemesis the Warlock (1987) – based on the comic.
- Nigel Mansell's Grand Prix (1987)
- The Fury (1988)
- Rex (1988)
- Vixen (1988)

As Screen 7:

- High Steel (1989)
- Jaws (1989) – based on the film
