= W.A.R. =

1986 video game

- Cover art
- Developer: Software Communications
- Publisher: Martech
- Composer: Rob Hubbard (C64)
- Platforms: Acorn Electron, Amstrad CPC, BBC Micro, Commodore 64, ZX Spectrum
- Release: NA: 1986; EU: September 1986
- Genre: Scrolling shooter
- Mode: Single-player

This is an article about the computer game. For the Pharoahe Monch album, see W.A.R. (We Are Renegades).

W.A.R. is a video game produced by Martech. The BBC Micro version was written by Michael Archer while the Amstrad CPC version was written by John Edginton.

The Amstrad CPC version supported one of the first commercial mice in the form of the AMX Mouse.
