= Eddie Kidd =

English stunt performer

Eddie Kidd OBE
- Born: Edward Kidd; 22 June 1959 (age 66); Islington, London, England
- Occupation: Former stunt performer
- Years active: 1974-1998; 2002; 2012-present
- Spouses: Debbie Ash (divorced); Sarah Carr (divorced) Samantha Kirli (m. 2007; div. 2012)
- Children: 2

Edward Kidd OBE (born 22 June 1959) is an English former stunt performer. He was paralysed and suffered brain damage following an accident in 1996. On 15 June 2012 it was announced that he had been made an Officer of the Order of the British Empire in the Queen's Birthday Honours List for services to charity.

== Stunt work ==
Kidd started his career at the age of fourteen. He is the holder of many world records for jumping over cars and buses. He has worked as a stunt double in many films, notably for Timothy Dalton in The Living Daylights, Roger Moore and Michael Caine in Bullseye! and Pierce Brosnan in GoldenEye. One of his most famous motorcycle stunts was in the 1979 film Hanover Street starring Harrison Ford. Doubling for Ford on a motorbike he jumped a 120 feet (37 m) railway cutting at 90 miles per hour (140 km/h) in Shepton Mallet, Somerset. He also doubled for Val Kilmer in Top Secret!.

In his role as stunt biker Dave Munday in the 1981 film Riding High, Kidd performed a motorcycle jump across an 80-foot gap in a disused viaduct across the Blackwater River in Essex. In 1993, he jumped over the Great Wall of China on a motorcycle. Despite performing over 12,000 jumps in his career, he did not have a UK motorcycle licence until 1995.

=== Jump contest ===
In 1993, the American motorcycle daredevil Robbie Knievel challenged Kidd to a world title motorcycle "jump off" competition in Bay St. Louis, Mississippi, USA. Knievel, son of the daredevil Evel Knievel, had deemed Kidd to be the only motorcycle jump rider worthy of challenging him. The event was televised as a pay-per-view event titled The Daredevil Duel: Knievel vs. Kidd. The competition required each rider to make three motorbike jumps with the cumulative distance covered by each used to determine the winner: Kidd won by six feet. As Knievel and Kidd did not meet again competitively the winner's belt remains with Kidd.

=== Accident ===
On 6 August 1996, Kidd was involved in a serious motorcycle accident while performing at the Bulldog Bash, held at Long Marston Airfield near Stratford-upon-Avon. In comparison to some of his previous stunts, the jump Kidd made that day was relatively minor, comprising a jump of approximately 15 m (49 ft) across a drag strip. The relatively short landing area beyond the drag strip consisted of an uphill incline leading to the edge of a steep embankment. Although Kidd completed the jump and landed the bike upright on two wheels, his chin struck the petrol tank of his motorcycle and he was knocked unconscious. As a result, he was unable to prevent himself and his bike from continuing up and over the 6 m (20 ft) embankment edge. He sustained serious head and pelvic injuries in the resulting fall. After the accident, doctors told Kidd's parents that it was possible he could be in a coma for up to 10 years. However, he regained consciousness within three months of the accident, but was left paralysed and with brain damage.

== Later career ==
Kidd appeared in an episode of Russell Brand's 2002 TV documentary series RE:Brand to talk about his life after the accident. Kidd took control of a motorcycle again when he formally opened the Beyond Boundaries Live 2007 Exhibition at Sandown Park, Esher on 29 June 2007. On 17 July 2012, he carried the Olympic Torch during its relay journey through Lewes, East Sussex.

On 17 April 2011, Kidd started the 2011 London Marathon, ditching his wheelchair at the start and walking the rest of the way, stating it would take "four weeks to complete" and that it was his "greatest stunt yet". On 6 June, he completed it. Kidd also said he would compete in another marathon in two years' time.

== Personal life ==
Kidd was once married to dancer and actress Debbie Ash, the sister of actress Leslie Ash; after having one child they divorced. Kidd married Stringfellows waitress Sarah Carr and they had one child before their divorce.

Twenty-three years after a brief relationship with her, Kidd met model Samantha Kirli again in 2004 and they married in 2007 but separated in December 2012. In August 2013, Kirli was convicted of assaulting Kidd. The court heard that she tried to throttle Kidd, slapped him on the face and chest and kicked him. She was sentenced to five months in prison and a restraining order was issued against her.

== Popular culture ==
In 1984, Martech released a computer game based on Kidd's stunts titled Eddie Kidd Jump Challenge.

In 1987, Kidd branched into clothes and hair modelling and appeared in commercials for Sunsilk, Vileda and Levi's.

Kidd has also had a singing career, releasing two albums and several singles including "Leave it to the Kidd" (Decca FR 13795).
