= Corinne Russell =

English glamour model and dancer

- Born: 22 November 1963 (age 62); Bromsgrove, Worcestershire, England
- Occupations: Glamour model; dancer
- Years active: 1983–1993

Corinne Russell (born 22 November 1963) is an English former Page 3 girl, glamour model and dancer during the 1980s.

== Modelling career ==
Russell made her Page 3 debut in The Sun on 23 August 1982, and first appearing in the Daily Star on 7 September, notching up 189 appearances in total (118 in The Sun and 71 in the Daily Star), before making her final appearances in The Sun on 27 September, and 8 October 1990 in the Daily Star respectively.

== Acting career ==
=== Television ===
She became one of the "Hill's Angels" on the 1983 cycle of The Benny Hill Show. Also in 1983 she was part of Flick Colby's Zoo dancers on Top Of The Pops, featuring heavily in the dance to "Waiting On A Train" by Flash And The Pan on 02.06.83. She later became a regular on the third series of The Kenny Everett Television Show in 1985. Later, in 1989, she had a nonspeaking role in Dennis Potter's adaptation of Blackeyes. She appears in one episode of In Sickness and in Health (S04E04) in a non speaking role, and in The Manageress (S02E05).

=== Film ===
Her film work includes Absolute Beginners as the Giant Typewriter Dancer and a small speaking role in Highlander as the hooker "Candy". Russell was chosen to dance in silhouette during the opening credits of the 1983 James Bond film Octopussy. She also had a speaking role in the TV movie Harry's Kingdom as the car model "Suzi Lake". She had a minor role in Bolero.

=== Music video ===
She led other leather-clad women with zippers at the groin region of their suits in the AC/DC music video "You Shook Me All Night Long". It was revealed on the VH1 series Pop-up Video that during the shot with the mechanical bull, she accidentally jabbed herself with her spur twice. The roadie who came to her aid married her a year later: Angus Young, AC/DC's lead guitarist, gave the couple a mechanical bull for a wedding present as a joke. The couple later divorced.

=== Video games ===
She appeared on the cover of the video game Vixen (1988) and her movements were recorded in an early use of motion capture technology to create the animation for the main character.

== Filmography ==
Year	Title	Role	Notes
1984	Bolero	Outdoor hot tub girl	Uncredited
1986	Highlander	Candy	
1986	Absolute Beginners	Dancer	
