= Planet Michael =

- Developer(s): SEE Digital Studios AB
- Publisher(s): SEE Virtual Worlds, LLC
- Platform(s): Microsoft Windows
- Genre(s): MMORPG

Planet Michael was a planned MMORPG inspired by the music, videos, and life of Michael Jackson. It was being developed by SEE Digital Studios AB and was to be published by SEE Virtual Worlds, LLC. The game was originally scheduled to be released in 2011, but nothing further has been released regarding this game other than some trailers that revealed little to no information regarding the game.

== Overview ==
Martin Biallas, CEO of SEE Virtual Worlds, stated that the gameplay would have "focused on Jackson's dance moves and adhere to his credo of nonviolence, a departure from other online multiplayer games such as World of Warcraft". The game would have also allowed for charitable contributions. The foundation of the game was to be based on Entropia Universe, a massively multiplayer online virtual universe designed by the Swedish software company MindArk.
