= Uchi Mata (video game) =

1986 video game

- Developers: Andy Walker; Paul Hodgson
- Publisher: Martech Games
- Platforms: Commodore 64, Amstrad CPC, ZX Spectrum, MSX
- Release: 1986
- Genres: Sports, Fighting
- Modes: Single-player, multiplayer

Uchi Mata (also known as Judo Uchi Mata) is a judo video game released in 1986 for various home computers by Martech Games. It was promoted by British Olympic judoka Brian Jacks, who also acted as technical advisor. It is the first fighting game to feature counters and hidden moves.

== Summary ==
This computer game is notable for its control scheme that allowed users to perform various fighting techniques.

A similar control scheme would be used a year later in Capcom's arcade game Street Fighter. Another feature that would later appear in Street Fighter was the inclusion of hidden moves: moves that were not included in the instruction manual that players would have to find on their own.

Unlike most other martial arts games the approach is more important than the actual kick/shove/punch etc., since the player must first grab the opponent and subsequently do an up/down/left/right combo (about ten different options to choose from) on the joystick before anything happens. The most powerful move is called uchi mata and if performed correctly it will knock out the opponent no matter how much strength he may have left. A nice little detail here is that the opponent's eyes (really just two black dots, and only one since the game is a side scroller) close/disappear when he lands on his back after a knock out-move, as if to say 'he's gone'. Punching is not allowed, yet there's one available punch in the game, and if executed the player is immediately disqualified.

There are six to seven opponents in each level and players can continue playing to work their way up the 'Dan' ratings.

== Reception ==
Reception

Review scores
Publication	Score
Crash	36%
Computer and Video Games	30/40
Sinclair User	7/10
Your Sinclair	7/10
Zzap!64	89%

The game received mixed reviews. The animation was praised by Sinclair User, but Crash criticised the controls. CVG said it was realistic but difficult. Phil South of Your Sinclair said "Uchi Mata is quite good fun, but it seemed a bit unfinished to me. Shame, 'cos with a bit of tickling up this could have been a surefire hit."

Uchi Mata sold poorly and it was soon re-released at budget price by Alternative Software. Alternative renamed the game as according to managing director Roger Hulley "the name didn't click, so we put the sport first and our title is called Judo Uchi Mata, which really sells". Judo Uchi Mata reached the number nine in the UK video games charts in Autumn 1987.
