= Brian Jacks Superstar Challenge =

1985 video game

- Developer: Martech
- Platforms: Acorn Electron, Amstrad CPC, BBC Micro, Commodore 64, MSX, ZX Spectrum
- Release: 1985

Brian Jacks Superstar Challenge is a 1985 sports simulation game released for various home computers by Martech, licensed by British sportsman, Brian Jacks. It was released for systems including the Commodore 64, BBC Micro, and Acorn Electron.

== Critical response ==
Electron User praised its "superb graphics" and the variety found in the different games.
