= Michael Jackson's Moonwalker =

1990 video game

In 1990, several video games based on the 1988 Michael Jackson film Moonwalker, all named Michael Jackson's Moonwalker, were released. Sega developed two beat 'em ups, one released in arcades and another released for the Sega Genesis and Master System consoles. U.S. Gold also published various games for home computers. Each of the games' plots loosely follows the "Smooth Criminal" segment of the film, in which Jackson rescues kidnapped children from the evil Mr. Big, and incorporates synthesized versions of some of the musician's songs. Following Moonwalker, Jackson collaborated with Sega on several other video games.

== Sega arcade version ==
Michael Jackson's Moonwalker
- European arcade flyer
- Developers: Sega; Triumph
- Publisher: Sega
- Producers: Michael Jackson; Roppyaku Tsurumi
- Designers: Michael Jackson; Roppyaku Tsurumi
- Composers: Tohru Nakabayashi; Michael Jackson
- Platform: Arcade
- Release: EU: July 1990; JP/NA: August 1990
- Genres: Beat 'em up, run-and-gun
- Modes: Single-player, multiplayer
- Arcade system: Sega System 18

Michael Jackson's Moonwalker (Note: Japanese: マイケル・ジャクソンズ・ムーンウォーカー, Hepburn: Maikeru Jakusonzu Mūnwōkā) is an arcade video game by Sega (programming) and Triumph International (audiovisuals), with the help of Jackson which was released on the Sega System 18 hardware. The arcade has distinctively different gameplay from its computer and console counterparts, focusing more on beat 'em up gameplay elements rather than platform gameplay.

=== Gameplay ===
The game is essentially a beat-em-up that is drawn using isometric video game graphics, although Jackson attacks with magic powers instead of physical contact, and has the ability to shoot short-ranged magic power at enemies. The magic power can be charged by holding the attack button to increase the range and damage of the magic power while moonwalking. If up close to enemies, Jackson executes a spinning melee attack using magic power.

Screenshot of the arcade video game

If the cabinet supports it, up to three people can play simultaneously. All three players play as Jackson, dressed in his suit (white for player 1, red for player 2, black for player 3).

Jackson's special attack is termed "Dance Magic". There are three different dance routines that may be performed, namely the dance routines from Smooth Criminal, Beat It and Billie Jean. The player starts with one to three of these attacks per credit (depending on how the machine is set up).

Bubbles, Michael's real-life pet chimpanzee, appears in each level. Once collected or rescued, Bubbles transforms Michael into a robotic version, with the ability to shoot laser bursts and missiles and absorb significantly more damage.

=== Development ===
In 1988, Michael Jackson contacted Sega about developing a video game that would capture his persona. Sega and Jackson then began working on an arcade video game based on his Moonwalker film and "Smooth Criminal" music video released that year. A prototype unit was demonstrated at Mexico's American Amusement Machine Association (AAMA) exhibition in early July 1990. Jackson assisted Sega's game designers on the development of the game.

=== Reception ===
In North America, the game had a successful launch. It was the top-grossing new video game on the RePlay arcade charts in September 1990.

The game received a positive review from RePlay magazine.

== Sega console versions ==
Michael Jackson's Moonwalker
- Developers: Sega (MD/Genesis); Sega/Arc System Works (SMS)
- Publisher: Sega
- Director: Tadashi Koizumi
- Producer: Michael Jackson
- Designers: Chie Yoshida; Jina Ishiwatari Tsukahara; Michael Jackson
- Programmer: Masanobu Yamamoto
- Composers: Hiroshi Kubota; Takayuki Nakamura
- Platforms: Mega Drive/Genesis, Master System
- Release: Mega Drive/Genesis: JP: August 25, 1990; NA: September 1990; EU: January 1991; Master System: EU: February 1991; NA: May 1991
- Genres: Beat 'em up, platformer
- Mode: Single-player

Home versions of the game were released for Sega's Mega Drive/Genesis and Master System home video game systems though the gameplay was completely different from the arcade version. A version was also rated by PEGI for release on Virtual Console, but it never materialized, and it was never specified which version was considered for rerelease. The home console versions were actually based on an evolved version of the home computer version of the game (with gameplay somewhat similar to the Shinobi series), in contrast to the arcade version which was a three-quarters view shooter/fighter type game. The game involves the player controlling the pop star in a quest to save all the children who have been kidnapped by Mr. Big.

The game's levels and music were borrowed from the film (though many of the music tracks were taken from Jackson's Bad and Thriller albums as well) and the player has the ability to destroy enemies by making them dance. Jackson can become a robot by rescuing a certain child and then grabbing a comet that falls from the sky.

=== Gameplay ===
The gameplay is focused on finding children, all of whom resemble Katie from the movie, who are scattered throughout the levels, some behind objects such as doors. Most of the objects are empty or contain enemies. Jackson's standard attack is a stylized high kick that is commonly incorporated into his dance routines; in the Sega Genesis version, Jackson's attacks fire off blue sparks, giving him greater offensive range. If the player continues to hold the attack button, and moves Jackson backwards, he performs his Moonwalk dance move. Jackson also has a special attack button which, when held, will cause him to start spinning; releasing it will cause him to throw his hat at enemies, destroying them instantly, but if the button is held for longer, Jackson will bring all on-screen enemies together to start dancing to his music. Once the choreography is finished, all enemies are damaged or defeated. These special attacks cost Jackson some health, sapping up to half his full life bar at full charge. Rescuing children restores some of Jackson's health. Once all children are rescued, Bubbles will mount on Michael's shoulders and point him in the direction of the level's final confrontation, where Mr. Big taunts him before sending waves of enemies for Jackson to defeat (on the Master System version, Bubbles is absent, and the levels cut straight from the final child to the enemy rush).

=== Prototype ===
A prototype of the Sega Genesis version dated April 24, 1990 surfaced that contains various differences from the final version. Most notably a full "Thriller" music track is present in the graveyard stage as well as a different final boss battle which is incomplete. Other differences include but are not limited to: changes in level layouts, different cutscenes, as well as minor differences in sound samples and other musical tracks. The prototype was acquired by Landon White who dumped and preserved the ROM file online on August 6, 2018.

== Ports ==
Moonwalker: The Computer Game
- Developers: Emerald Software; Keypunch Software
- Publisher: U.S. Gold
- Platforms: Amiga, Amstrad CPC, Atari ST, Commodore 64, MS-DOS, MSX, ZX Spectrum
- Release: EU: August 24, 1989
- Genre: Action
- Mode: Single-player

Versions of the game were released for the popular 8-bit and 16-bit home computers of the time. They were developed by two small software houses, Irish Emerald Software Ltd and American Keypunch Software, and published by U.K. company U.S. Gold.

=== Gameplay ===
The game has four levels. The first is a top-down maze-style level. The next level has similar gameplay, riding the motorcycle collecting tokens.

The third level is a side-scrolling level based on the "Smooth Criminal" clip. The player collects ammunition and shoots at gangsters in openings above the player character.

The last level involves morphing into a robot and shooting at soldiers in openings, with the player controlling a crosshair.

== Reception ==
Reception

Aggregate score
| Aggregator | Score | | | | | |
| Aggregator | Arcade | C64 | Master System | Sega Genesis | Wii | ZX |
|---|---|---|---|---|---|---|
| GameRankings | | | | 54.2% (retrospective) | | |

Review scores
| Publication | Score | | | | | |
| Publication | Arcade | C64 | Master System | Sega Genesis | Wii | ZX |
|---|---|---|---|---|---|---|
| Crash | | | | | | 70% |
| Computer and Video Games | 90% | | | | | |
| Electronic Gaming Monthly | | | | 7/10, 7/10, 7/10, 7/10 | | |
| IGN | | | | | 4.5/10 | |
| Sinclair User | 92% | | | | | 6/10 |
| Your Sinclair | | | | | | 75% |
| Zzap!64 | | 60% | | | | |
| Compute's Guide | | | | 19/20 | | |
| Console XS | | | 85% | | | |
| Mega | | | | 78% | | |
| MegaTech | | | | 85% | | |
| Sega Power | | | | 90% | | |

MegaTech said that the Mega Drive version was an addictive platform game that had "excellent graphics". Mega magazine placed the game at number 91 in their list of the best Mega Drive games of all time, saying it was average. In 2004, the Genesis version of Moonwalker was inducted into GameSpot's list of the greatest games of all time.

Your Sinclair compared the ZX Spectrum version of the game to Gauntlet and Operation Wolf, saying it was well animated and "a surprising amount of fun".

== Legacy ==
Jackson later would go on to have a cameo role in Sega's Space Channel 5 and Space Channel 5: Part 2 music/rhythm games for the Dreamcast and PlayStation 2. Jackson's cameo did not return in the VR version of the first game. Jackson also appeared as a secret character in Ready 2 Rumble Boxing: Round 2.

== Soundtrack ==
All three games included a different selection of songs.

| Song | Computer | Arcade | Console |
|---|---|---|---|
| "Another Part of Me" | | 4 | 3 |
| "Bad" | 1 | 1, 5 | 5 |
| "Beat It" | | 3 | 2 |
| "Billie Jean" | | Ending | 4 |
| "Smooth Criminal" | 3 | 2 | 1 |
| "Speed Demon" | 2 | | |
| "Thriller" | | | 3 |
| "The Way You Make Me Feel" | 4 | | |

== See also ==
- Michael Jackson in video games
