= Roppyaku Tsurumi =

Japanese game producer and designer (born 1965)

- 鶴見 六百
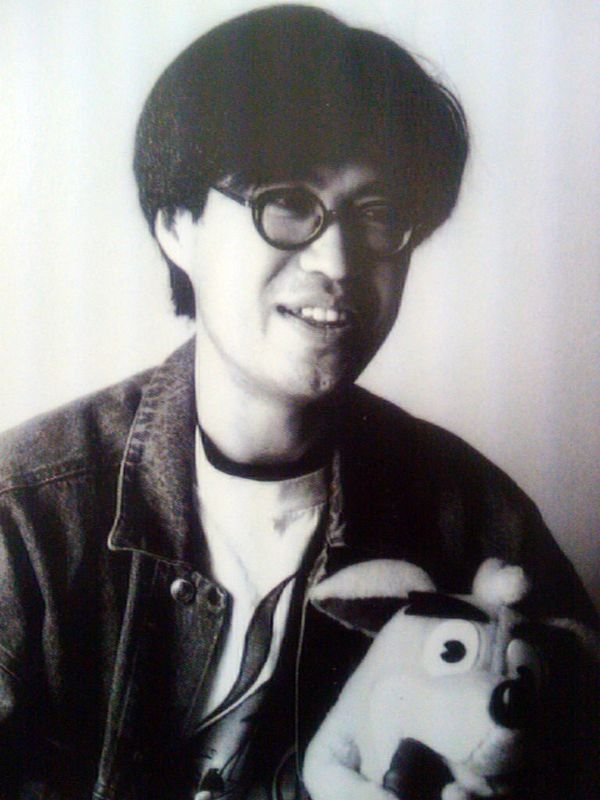
- Born: 17 December 1965 (age 60); Saku, Nagano, Japan
- Education: Waseda University
- Occupations: Video game producer and designer
- Years active: 1984–present
- Employers: Sega (1989–1995); Sony Computer Entertainment (1996–2009); Sammy Corporation (2009–2012); Arzest (2012–2022)
- Notable work: Michael Jackson's Moonwalker

Roppyaku Tsurumi (鶴見 六百, Tsurumi Roppyaku; born 17 December 1965) is a Japanese game producer and designer, known for the Japanese localization of the original Crash Bandicoot and Jak and Daxter series. He works for Sony Computer Entertainment. In Japanese Roppyaku literally means "six hundred."

One of his earliest works in his career is producing and designing the arcade version of Michael Jackson's Moonwalker.
