= Tsurumi River =

River in Tokyo and Kanagawa

Tsurumi River Tsurumi-gawa
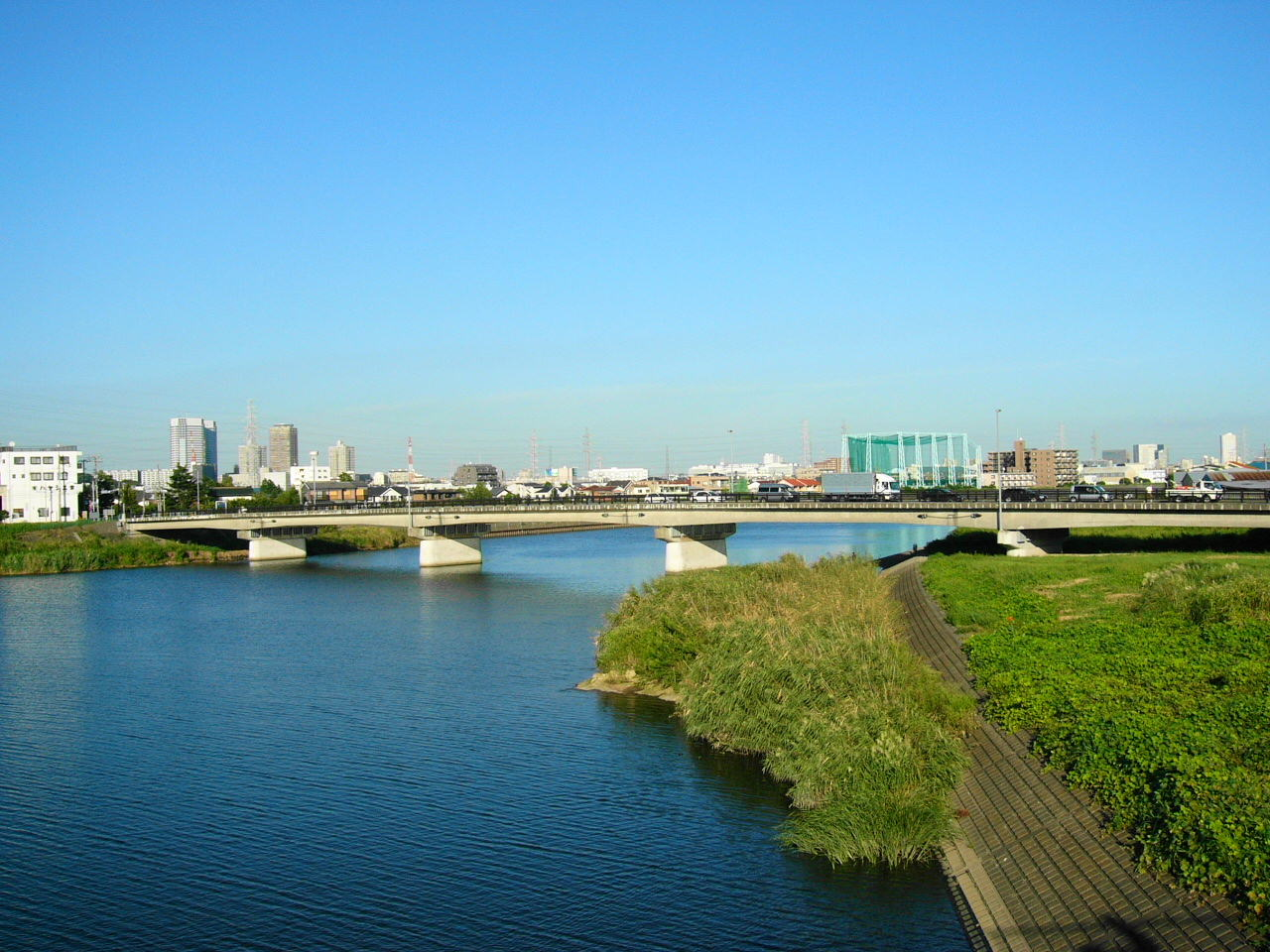
- Tsurumi River

- Location within Japan
- Native name: 鶴見川 (Japanese)

Physical characteristics
- Source
  - location: Kamioyamada-machi, Machida, Tokyo
- Mouth: Tokyo Bay
  - location: Tsurumi-ku, Yokohama
  - coordinates: 35°28′43″N 139°41′00″E
- Length: 42.5 km (26.4 mi)
- Basin size: 235 km^{2} (91 mi^{2})
- Discharge
  - average: 10.1 m^{3}/s (360 cu ft/s)

Basin features
- River system: Tsurumi River
- Population: 1,960,000
- Bridges: Takano Ōhashi

The Tsurumi River (鶴見川, Tsurumi-gawa) is a Class A river in Kanagawa and Tokyo Prefectures on Honshū, Japan. It begins in Kamioyamada-machi, Machida and flows 42.5 kilometres (26.4 mi) before emptying into Tokyo Bay at the Keihin industrial area of Tsurumi-ku, Yokohama.

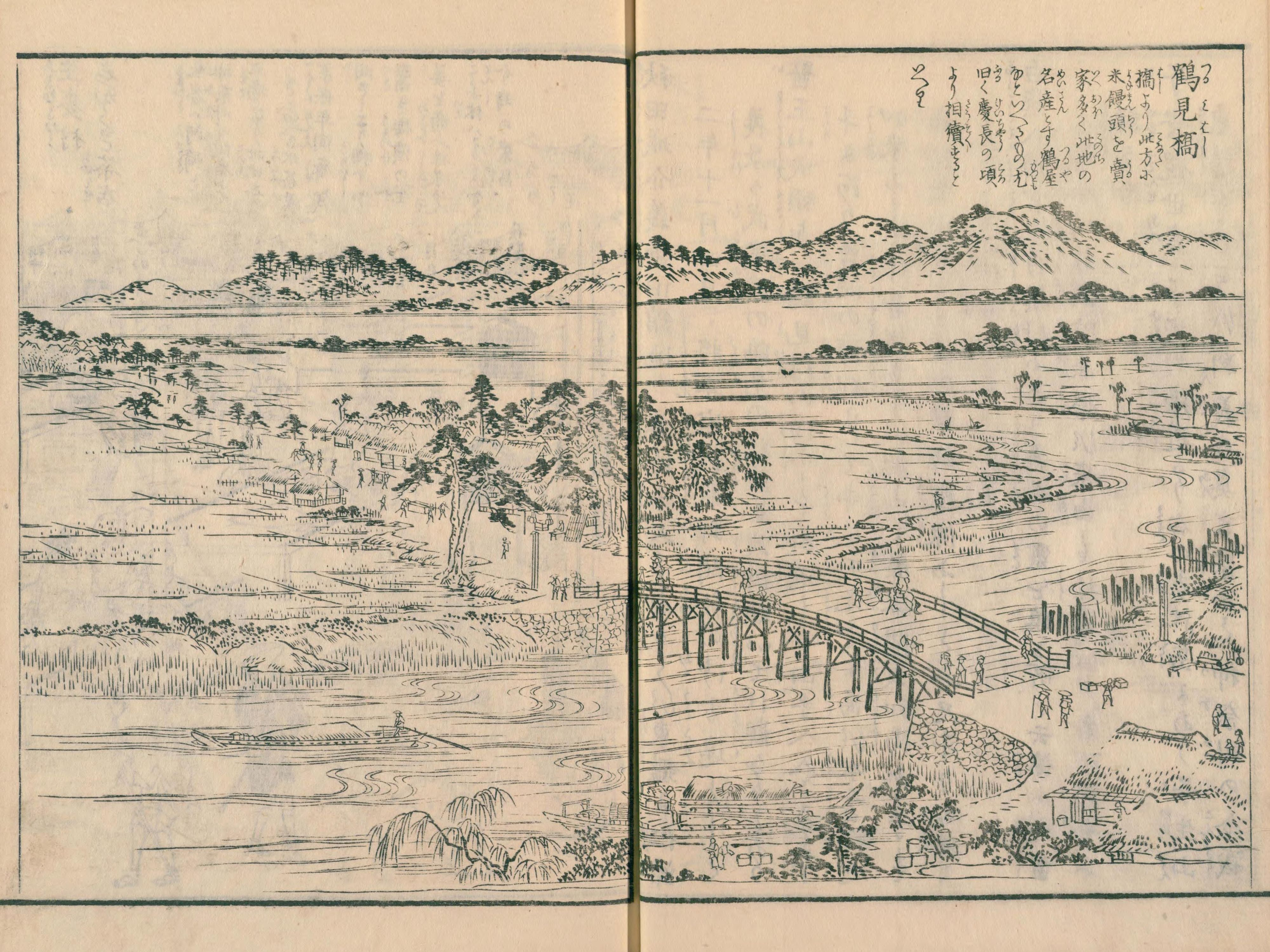
鶴見川橋 in the 17th century.
