= 2010 Major League Baseball All-Star Game =

2010 American baseball competition

	1	2	3	4	5	6	7	8	9	R	H	E
National League	0	0	0	0	0	0	3	0	0	3	7	1
American League	0	0	0	0	1	0	0	0	0	1	6	0
- Date: July 13, 2010
- Venue: Angel Stadium of Anaheim
- City: Anaheim, California
- Managers: Charlie Manuel (PHI); Joe Girardi (NYY)
- MVP: Brian McCann (ATL)
- Attendance: 45,408
- Ceremonial first pitch: Rod Carew
- Television: Fox and n3D (3D) (United States); MLB International (International)
- TV announcers: Joe Buck and Tim McCarver (Fox); Kenny Albert and Mark Grace (n3D); Gary Thorne and Rick Sutcliffe (MLB International)
- Radio: ESPN
- Radio announcers: Jon Sciambi and Dave Campbell

The 2010 Major League Baseball All-Star Game was the 81st midseason exhibition between the All-Stars of the American League (AL) and the National League (NL), the two leagues comprising Major League Baseball. The game was held on July 13, 2010, at Angel Stadium of Anaheim, the home of the American League Los Angeles Angels of Anaheim, and was telecast by Fox Sports in the US, with Joe Buck and Tim McCarver in the broadcast booth. Fox also teamed with DirecTV to produce a separate 3D broadcast, the first ever for a network Major League Baseball game. Kenny Albert and Mark Grace called the 3D telecast. ESPN Radio also broadcast the game, with Jon Sciambi and Dave Campbell announcing. The National League won the game 3–1, ending a 13-game winless streak.

This was the third All-Star Game hosted by the city of Anaheim, California, which previously hosted the game in 1967 and 1989. From 2003 to 2016, the winning team earned home field advantage for the World Series. This was the first All-Star Game the National League won since 1996, giving the NL said advantage in the World Series for the first time since 2001 – ironically, the winning pitcher, Washington Nationals closer Matt Capps, would go on to participate in the American League playoffs after his trade to the Minnesota Twins just a couple of weeks following the Midsummer Classic.

A short memorial honoring George Steinbrenner, the owner of the New York Yankees who died early that morning, was held prior to the game.

== New rules ==
The 2010 All-Star Game marked the first time major changes took place since the 2003 decision to begin handing home field in the World Series to the winning league. The designated hitter became a permanent fixture of the game regardless of site (a change which became more noticeable when the game was next played in a National League park – in 2011 at Chase Field in Phoenix). But, continuing with past precedent, whereas fans voted the American League starter in, as they did in previous years when an A.L. city hosted the game, the National League's manager continued to name his team's DH before the game from the list of reserves (player-elected and manager-chosen).

Other changes included having the rosters of each league team increased to 34 players. Pitchers who started the regular-season game on the Sunday immediately before the game became ineligible to pitch in the game, and were replaced on the roster (this rule would be invoked for three players selected for the American League squad – Trevor Cahill, CC Sabathia and Jered Weaver). As with any player ineligible or unable to play, each was still recognized as an All-Star.

Finally, a modified re-entry rule also made its debut (though saw no usage in this contest). In addition to the existing injured catcher rule, the manager was now allowed to select one position player to re-enter a game in the event that the last available position player at any position is injured.

== Related events ==
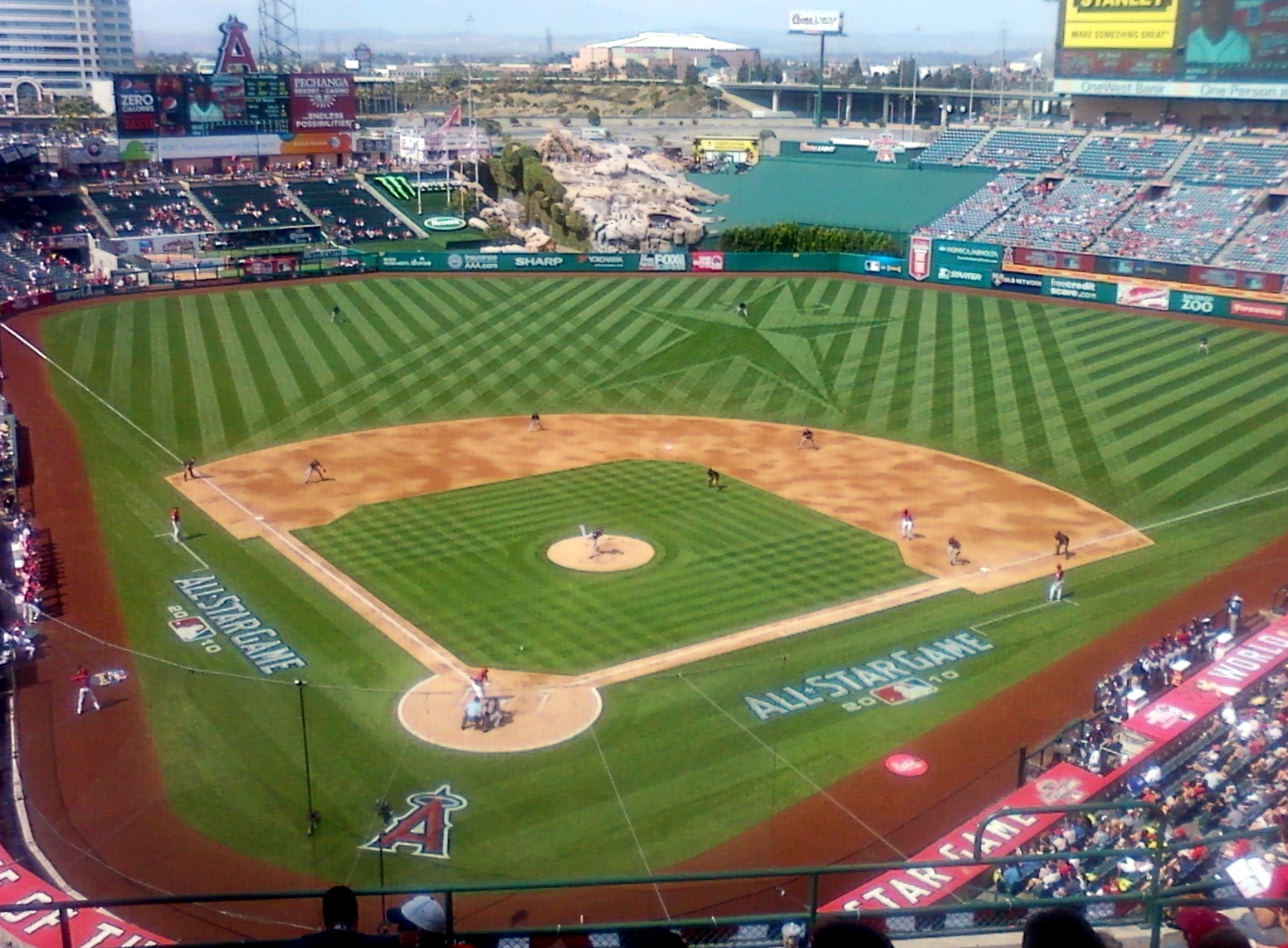
Players in action during the XM All-Star Futures Game

- The All-Star Fan Fest, a quasi museum/theme park, was held from July 8 through 13 at the Anaheim Convention Center across the street from Disneyland. July 8 was reserved for media and VIP, while the public opening came on July 9.
- The Sirius XM Radio All-Star Futures Game and Taco Bell All-Star Legends and Celebrity Softball Game were held July 11 at Angel Stadium of Anaheim. In addition, the second annual 5K Charity Run and Fun Walk was held that morning. ESPN2 televised the Futures game, while ESPN taped the Legends and Celebrity softball game for a later telecast.
- The Gatorade Workout Day and State Farm Home Run Derby also took place at Angel Stadium on July 12. MLB Network telecast the Workout Day events, while ESPN televised the Home Run Derby live, and was also broadcast in 3D on ESPN 3D.
- The Chevrolet All-Star Red Carpet Parade took place on the morning of the event starting near It's a Small World to Main Street USA. MLB Network telecast the Parade on a delayed tape basis.
  - Due to this, everything along the parade route (It's a Small World, Mickey's Toontown, Alice in Wonderland, Mad Tea Party, Matterhorn, Fantasyland Theatre, Sleeping Beauty Castle, and the Disneyland Railroad) remain closed when the park opened. They all opened for the day at noon.

== Final roster spot ==
After the rosters were revealed, a second ballot of five players per league was created for the All-Star Final Vote to determine the 34th and final player of each roster, with online balloting conducted from Sunday afternoon, July 4, through Thursday afternoon, July 8. The winners of the final vote were Nick Swisher of the New York Yankees and Joey Votto of the Cincinnati Reds.

Player	Team	Pos.	Player	Team	Pos
American League			National League		
Nick Swisher	NYY	OF	Joey Votto	CIN	1B
Paul Konerko	CWS	1B	Heath Bell	SD	P §
Delmon Young	MIN	OF	Carlos González	COL	OF
Michael Young	TEX	3B	Billy Wagner	ATL	P
Kevin Youkilis	BOS	1B	Ryan Zimmerman	WAS	3B

§ – When Bell replaced Yovani Gallardo due to injury on Wednesday, July 7, his name was withdrawn from the Final Vote ballot.

== Rosters ==
Players in italics have since been inducted into the National Baseball Hall of Fame.

=== American League ===
Elected starters
Position	Player	Team	All-Star Games
C	Joe Mauer	Twins	4
1B	Justin Morneau^{#}	Twins	4
2B	Robinson Canó	Yankees	2
3B	Evan Longoria	Rays	3
SS	Derek Jeter	Yankees	11
OF	Carl Crawford	Rays	4
OF	Josh Hamilton	Rangers	3
OF	Ichiro Suzuki	Mariners	10
DH	Vladimir Guerrero	Rangers	9

==== Reserves ====
Pitchers
Position	Player	Team	All-Star Games
P	Andrew Bailey^{[A]}	Athletics	2
P	Clay Buchholz^{#}	Red Sox	1
P	Trevor Cahill^{#}	Athletics	1
P	Fausto Carmona	Indians	1
P	Neftalí Feliz	Rangers	1
P	Phil Hughes	Yankees	1
P	Cliff Lee*	Rangers	2
P	Jon Lester	Red Sox	1
P	Andy Pettitte^{[B]}	Yankees	3
P	David Price	Rays	1
P	Mariano Rivera^{#}	Yankees	11
P	CC Sabathia^{#}	Yankees	4
P	Joakim Soria	Royals	2
P	Rafael Soriano^{[C]}	Rays	1
P	Matt Thornton	White Sox	1
P	José Valverde	Tigers	2
P	Justin Verlander^{[D]}	Tigers	3
P	Jered Weaver^{#}^{[E]}	Angels	1

Position Players
Position	Player	Team	All-Star Games
C	John Buck^{[F]}	Blue Jays	1
C	Victor Martinez^{#}	Red Sox	4
1B	Miguel Cabrera^{[G]}	Tigers	5
1B	Paul Konerko^{[H]}	White Sox	4
2B	Ian Kinsler^{[I]}	Rangers	2
2B	Dustin Pedroia^{#}	Red Sox	3
2B	Ty Wigginton	Orioles	1
3B	Adrián Beltré	Red Sox	1
3B	Alex Rodriguez	Yankees	13
SS	Elvis Andrus	Rangers	1
OF	José Bautista	Blue Jays	1
OF	Torii Hunter	Angels	4
OF	Nick Swisher	Yankees	1
OF	Vernon Wells	Blue Jays	3
DH	David Ortiz	Red Sox	6

=== National League ===
Elected starters
Position	Player	Team	All-Star Games
C	Yadier Molina	Cardinals	2
1B	Albert Pujols	Cardinals	9
2B	Chase Utley^{#}	Phillies	5
3B	David Wright	Mets	5
SS	Hanley Ramírez	Marlins	3
OF	Ryan Braun	Brewers	3
OF	Andre Ethier	Dodgers	1
OF	Jason Heyward^{#}	Braves	1
DH	Ryan Howard	Phillies	3

==== Reserves ====
Pitchers
Position	Player	Team	All-Star Games
P	Heath Bell^{[J]}	Padres	2
P	Jonathan Broxton	Dodgers	2
P	Matt Capps	Nationals	1
P	Chris Carpenter	Cardinals	3
P	Yovani Gallardo^{#}	Brewers	1
P	Roy Halladay	Phillies	7
P	Tim Hudson	Braves	3
P	Ubaldo Jiménez	Rockies	1
P	Josh Johnson	Marlins	2
P	Hong-Chih Kuo^{[K]}	Dodgers	1
P	Tim Lincecum	Giants	3
P	Evan Meek	Pirates	1
P	Arthur Rhodes	Reds	1
P	Adam Wainwright	Cardinals	1
P	Brian Wilson	Giants	2

Position Players
Position	Player	Team	All-Star Games
C	Brian McCann	Braves	5
1B	Adrián González	Padres	3
1B	Joey Votto	Reds	1
2B	Brandon Phillips	Reds	1
2B	Martín Prado^{[M]}	Braves	1
3B	Omar Infante	Braves	1
3B	Scott Rolen	Reds	6
SS	Rafael Furcal^{[N]}	Dodgers	2
SS	José Reyes^{#}^{[O]}	Mets	3
SS	Troy Tulowitzki^{#}	Rockies	1
OF	Michael Bourn	Astros	1
OF	Marlon Byrd	Cubs	1
OF	Corey Hart^{[P]}	Brewers	2
OF	Matt Holliday	Cardinals	4
OF	Chris Young	Diamondbacks	1

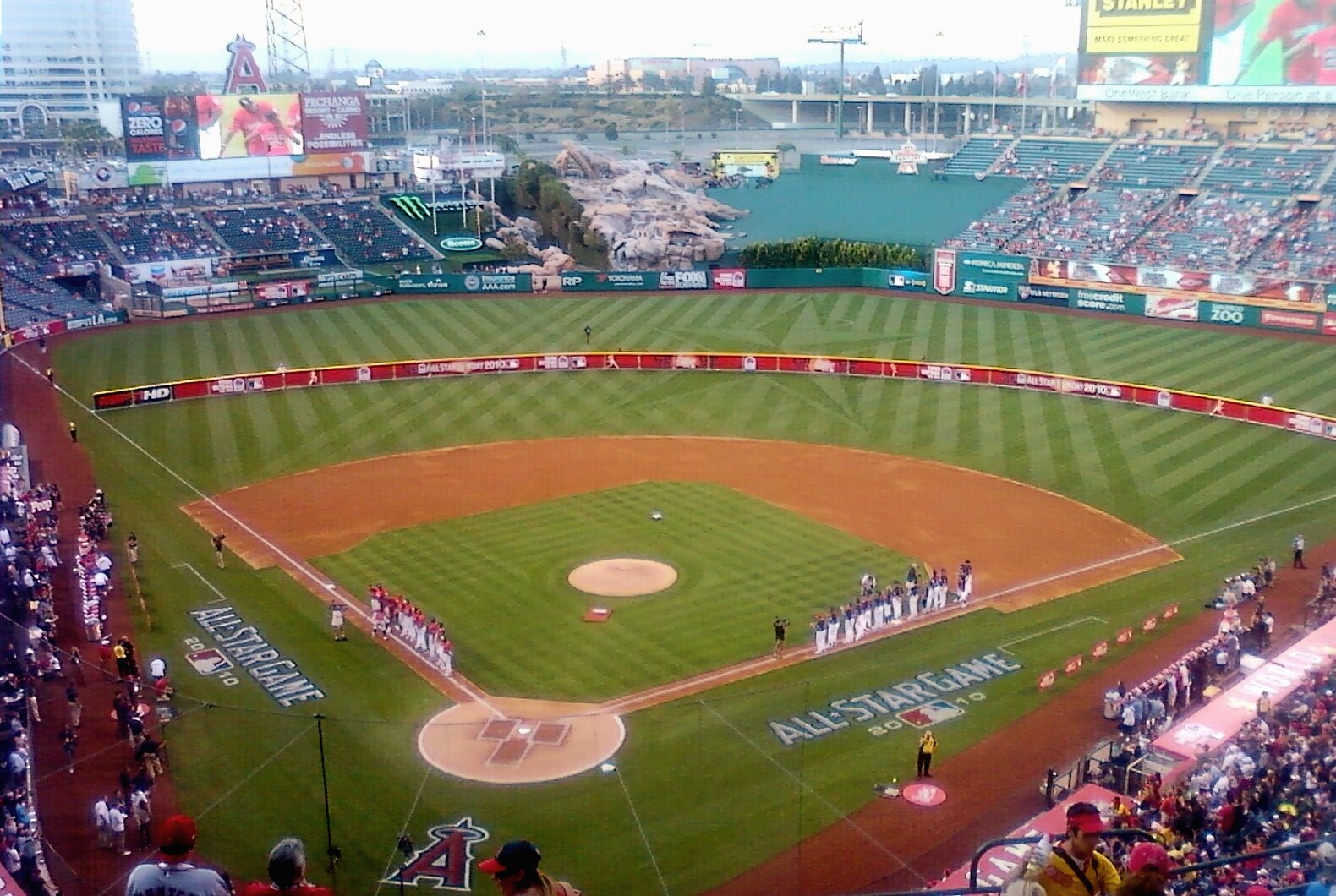
Pre-game lineup announcements for the Taco Bell All-Star Legends and Celebrity Softball Game

1. Andrew Bailey replaced Jered Weaver on the roster due to pitching ineligibility.
2. Andy Pettitte replaced Clay Buchholz on the roster due to injury.
3. Rafael Soriano replaced Mariano Rivera on the roster due to injury.
4. Justin Verlander replaced CC Sabathia on the roster due to pitching ineligibility.
5. Jered Weaver replaced Trevor Cahill on the roster due to pitching ineligibility.
6. John Buck replaced Victor Martinez on the roster due to injury.
7. Miguel Cabrera started in place of the injured Justin Morneau.
8. Paul Konerko replaced Justin Morneau on the roster due to injury.
9. Ian Kinsler replaced Dustin Pedroia on the roster due to injury.
10. Heath Bell replaced Yovani Gallardo on the roster due to injury.
11. Hong-Chih Kuo replaced Jason Hayward on the roster due to injury.
12. Ryan Howard was selected as NL starting Designated hitter.
13. Martín Prado started in place of the injured Chase Utley.
14. Rafael Furcal replaced Jose Reyes on the roster due to injury.
15. Jose Reyes replaced Troy Tulowitzki on the roster due to injury.
16. Corey Hart started in place of the injured Jason Heyward.

#: Indicates player would not play (replaced as per reference notes above).
*: Lee was elected as a Mariner, but was traded to the Rangers on July 9.

== Game ==
=== Starting lineups ===
National League				American League			
Order	Player	Team	Position	Order	Player	Team	Position
1	Hanley Ramírez	Marlins	SS	1	Ichiro Suzuki	Mariners	RF
2	Martín Prado	Braves	2B	2	Derek Jeter	Yankees	SS
3	Albert Pujols	Cardinals	1B	3	Miguel Cabrera	Tigers	1B
4	Ryan Howard	Phillies	DH	4	Josh Hamilton	Rangers	CF
5	David Wright	Mets	3B	5	Vladimir Guerrero	Rangers	DH
6	Ryan Braun	Brewers	LF	6	Evan Longoria	Rays	3B
7	Andre Ethier	Dodgers	CF	7	Joe Mauer	Twins	C
8	Corey Hart	Brewers	RF	8	Robinson Canó	Yankees	2B
9	Yadier Molina	Cardinals	C	9	Carl Crawford	Rays	LF
	Ubaldo Jiménez	Rockies	P		David Price	Rays	P

=== Game summary ===
Tuesday, July 13, 2010 5:50 pm (PDT) Angel Stadium of Anaheim in Anaheim, California
Team	1	2	3	4	5	6	7	8	9	R	H	E
National League	0	0	0	0	0	0	3	0	0	3	7	1
American League	0	0	0	0	1	0	0	0	0	1	6	0
WP: Matt Capps (WSH) 1-0 LP: Phil Hughes (NYY) 0-1 Sv: Jonathan Broxton (LAD) 1

UMPIRES: Home Plate – Mike Reilly; First base – Mike Winters; Second base – Brian O'Nora; Third base – Laz Díaz; Left Field – Bruce Dreckman; Right Field – Jim Wolf
Weather – 85 °F (29 °C), clear; Wind 5 mph (8 km/h) from the southwest – out to center field.
Time of Game – 2 hours, 59 minutes. Attendance – 45,408

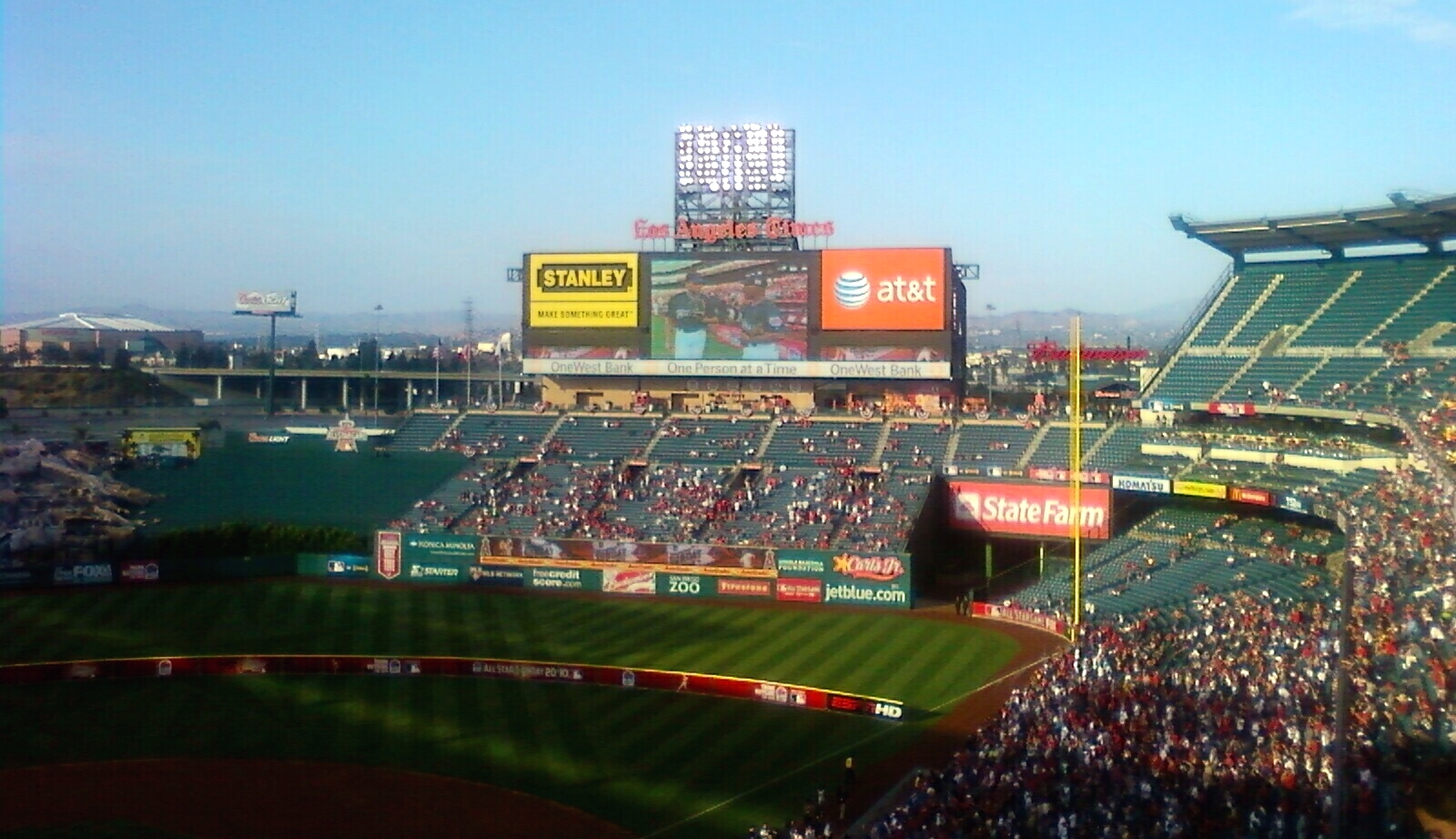
The 2010 All-Star Game marked the third time Angel Stadium hosted the matchup

Pitching dominated the first half of the ballgame, as both starting pitchers and their immediate successors put up zeroes. Both teams finally threatened to score in the fifth inning. With Justin Verlander on the mound for the American League, David Wright singled and stole second. Andre Ethier singled but Josh Hamilton was able to hold Wright at third with a strong throw from right field. With runners on the corners, Verlander was able get the final two outs of the inning. In the bottom of the inning, Hong-Chih Kuo walked Evan Longoria before allowing Joe Mauer to reach first and advance to second by throwing a ball over the first baseman's head and into the dugout. With runners on second and third and no outs, Kuo and Heath Bell were able to escape the inning by limiting the damage to one unearned run on a Robinson Canó sacrifice fly.

The game remained quiet until the top of the seventh inning. Phil Hughes allowed two singles before being lifted in favor of Matt Thornton. After getting Chris Young to pop up, Thornton loaded the bases on a walk to Marlon Byrd before allowing a bases-clearing double down the right field line to Brian McCann. Those would be the last runs scored in the game. The American League would threaten again in the bottom of the seventh. With runners on the corners and two outs, Torii Hunter struck out swinging against Adam Wainwright to end the burgeoning rally.

The bottom of the ninth would provide some drama, both on the field and in the dugout. With Jonathan Broxton in to close the game, David Ortiz hit a leadoff single to right. However, Ortiz was not lifted for a pinch runner although American League manager Joe Girardi still had Alex Rodriguez available on the bench. After Broxton struck out Adrián Beltré, Ortiz was thrown out advancing to second on a strong throw from Marlon Byrd on a John Buck single. In a controversial decision, Girardi allowed Ian Kinsler to bat despite having Rodriguez available to pinch-hit, and Kinsler subsequently flew out to center. His out not only ended the ballgame, it also ended the American League's run of dominance in the Midsummer Classic. This was also the second straight All-Star Game without a home run hit by either side.

== Entertainment ==
The Canadian Tenors performed the Canadian national anthem in English and French. Amber Riley sang the American national anthem and Beautiful by Christina Aguilera. Colbie Caillat sang God Bless America during the seventh inning stretch.
