= Foxtel 3D =

- Country: Australia

Programming
- Language: English
- Picture format: 1080i (3DTV)

Ownership
- Owner: Foxtel Networks

History
- Launched: 1 November 2010
- Closed: 27 August 2013

Foxtel 3D was an Australian television channel. Owned and operated by Foxtel, it was dedicated to 3D programming until it ceased operations in 2013 due to a lack of available 3D content.

== History ==
The first Foxtel 3D logo used

The Foxtel 3D channel launched on 1 November 2010, mainly taking sports programming from ESPN/ESPN 3D and FOX Sports. The channel also broadcast documentaries and live music events alongside sports coverage.

On 27 January 2011, the channel aired Despicable Me 3D, the first 3D movie on Australian television.

In July 2013, following the news that ESPN 3D and the BBC were ceasing 3D productions in 2013, Foxtel announced that Foxtel 3D would cease broadcasting on 27 August 2013 due to a lack of available 3D content, and also due to a lack of interest.
