= N3D =

n3D
- Country: United States
- Broadcast area: Nationwide

Programming
- Language: English
- Picture format: 720p (3DTV)

Ownership
- Owner: DirecTV
- Sister channels: Audience Network boosts Network; Root Sports

History
- Launched: July 1, 2010
- Closed: June 25, 2012

n3D was an American 3DTV channel that launched on July 1, 2010. It was sponsored by Panasonic and available exclusively on DirecTV. It was the world's first 24-hour 3DTV channel. Operations ended in 2013.

== Programs ==
Programming that aired includes TNT's broadcast of NASCAR's 2010 Coke Zero 400 on July 3; the local telecasts of the New York Yankees-Seattle Mariners series on July 10–11; and the 2010 Major League Baseball All-Star Game (in conjunction with Fox). Other shows include Guitar Center Sessions with artists Peter Gabriel and Jane's Addiction, plus such documentary fare as Dinosaurs: Giants of Patagonia, Wild Safari: A South African Adventure and nWave Picture's S.O.S Planet, African Adventure: Safari in the Okavango, Encounter in the Third Dimension.

Other new programming includes the new season of the History Channels series The Universe and the 2010 US Open Tennis Tournament. The channel will also show previously aired ESPN 3D events. On Christmas 2010 the channel aired The Prince's Trust Rock Gala 2010.

On February 4, 2011, n3D premiered Formula Drift's "Round 7: Title Fight Event". On February 5, 2011, n3D aired the Fifth Annual Celebrity Beach Bowl. Since February 26, 2011, the channel has aired the new season of GSN's High Stakes Poker. Starting March 26, 2011 n3D aired Treasure Houses of Britain, in conjunction with WNET. A new show about surfing titled Gone Until December debuted in summer 2011.

=== Originals and Exclusives ===
- 3D Tourist
- Celebrity Beach Bowl
- Fast Lane for Fun
- Gone Until December
- Guitar Center Sessions
- Live from The Laugh Factory
- The Dan Patrick Show
- The Parlotones: Dragonflies and Astronauts
- The Prince's Trust Rock Gala 2010
- Bon Jovi: What's Next? What Do You Got?

=== Partners ===
- Anschutz Entertainment Group
- CBS Sports
- ESPN 3D
- Food Network
- Formula Drift
- Fox Sports
- Golden Boy Promotions
- Game Show Network
- HDNet Fights
- History Channel
- IMAX
- MTV
- NBC Sports
- nWave Pictures
- PBS
- Professional Bull Riders
- Turner Broadcasting System
- World Fishing Network
