= Dead arm =

Dead arm may refer to:

- Dead arm (baseball), a colloquial term for a pitcher who seems unable to throw as hard as he usually does
- Dead arm (grapes), a dieback disease caused by the combination of two fungi, Eutypa armeniacae and Phomopsis viticola
- Dead arm syndrome, a repetitive motion syndrome in people
- Dead Arm, a wine produced by Australian wine estate d'Arenberg
