= Canal+ 3D =

Canal+ 3D may refer to several former 3D television channels:

- Canal+ 3D (France), owned by Canal Plus Group SA
- Canal+ 3D (Poland), owned by Canal Plus Group SA of France
- Canal+ 3D (Spain), owned by Telefónica
