= LG LX9500 =

- Manufacturer: LG Electronics
- Type: Television
- Released: May 2010
- Introductory price: ₩4.7 million (47")

The LG LX9500 is LG's 3D television set released in 2010. It was announced in March 2010 and released in May 2010. The LX9500 was released in two size variants: 47 and 55 inches.

== Features ==
The LX9500 is a 3D television which means it can convey depth perception to the viewer. It has a liquid-crystal display (LCD). LG promoted the LX9500 as the first fully backlit LED 3D TV. It lacks 2D-to-3D conversion capability, which is available on other models like Panasonic GT25 and LG PX950. Optional accessories include 3D glasses, a Wi-Fi dongle, and a wireless media box. The glasses have rechargeable batteries.

== Reception ==
CNET said the LG LX9500 is basically the same TV as the LG LE8500 but with additional 3D capability. Another CNET reviewer concluded: "Despite a couple of minor faults, it seems that LG has ended its poor showing so far by releasing the LX9500." Sound & Vision called the 3D implementation excellent and the glasses comfortable. In conclusion they said the TV "offers exceptionally good overall performance". PC Mag liked the picture quality and the appearance of the TV but noted the high price point. TechTudo noted the beautiful design and good image quality as positives and high price and weight as negatives.
