= Phil Hughes (baseball) =

American baseball player (born 1986)

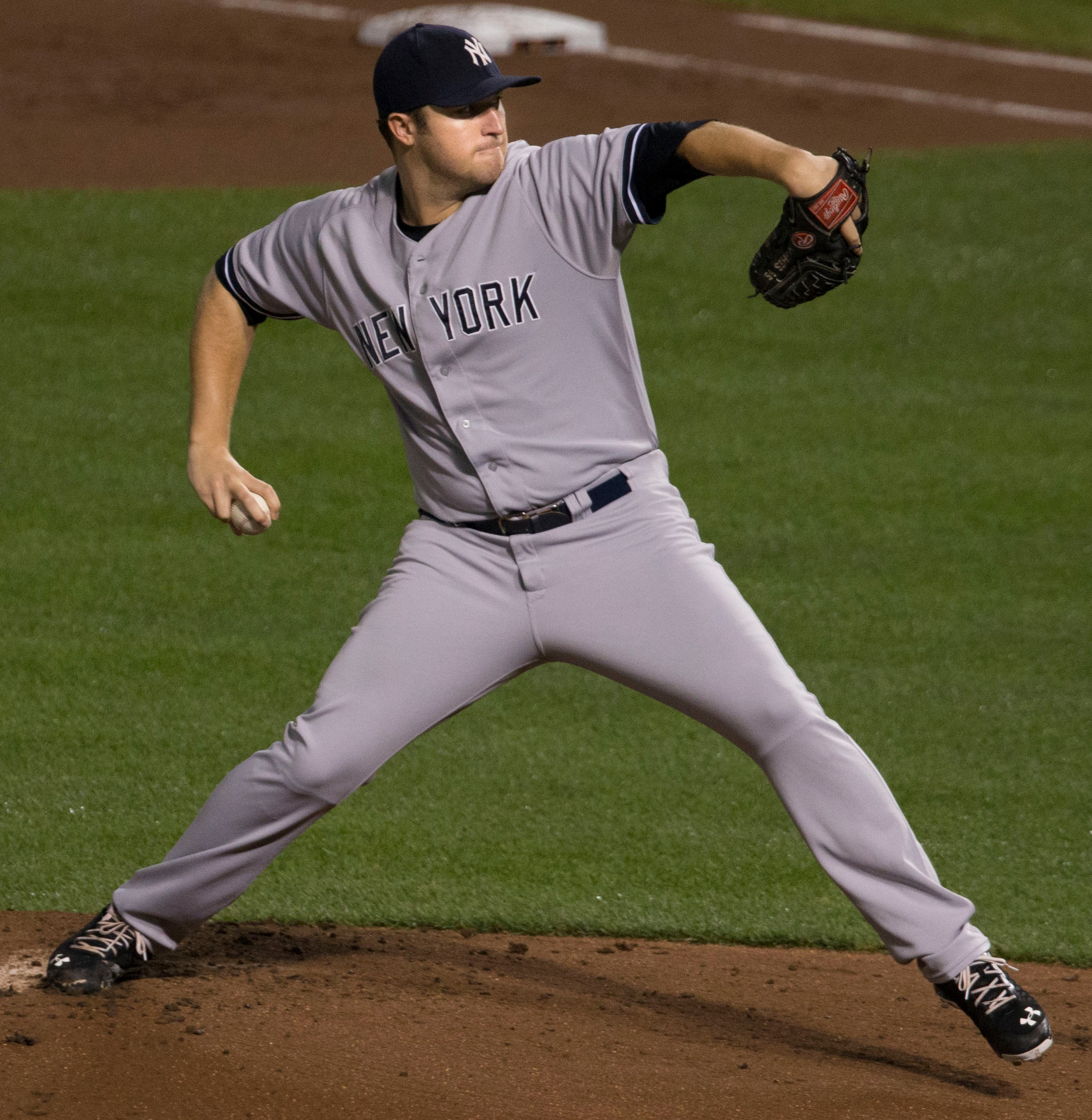
- Hughes in 2013 with the Yankees
- Pitcher
- Born: June 24, 1986 (age 40); Mission Viejo, California, U.S.
- Batted: Right Threw: Right

MLB debut
- April 26, 2007, for the New York Yankees

Last MLB appearance
- August 8, 2018, for the San Diego Padres

MLB statistics
- Win–loss record: 88–79
- Earned run average: 4.52
- Strikeouts: 1,040
- Stats at Baseball Reference

Teams
- New York Yankees (2007–2013); Minnesota Twins (2014–2018); San Diego Padres (2018)

Career highlights and awards
- All-Star (2010); World Series champion (2009)

Philip Joseph Hughes (born June 24, 1986) is an American former professional baseball pitcher. He played in Major League Baseball (MLB) for the New York Yankees, Minnesota Twins, and San Diego Padres during a career that spanned from 2007 through 2018. Hughes stands 6 feet 5 inches (1.96 m) tall and weighs 240 pounds (110 kg). He was the Yankees' first-round pick in the 2004 MLB draft.

During his time in the Yankees' minor-league system, Hughes became one of the most highly anticipated prospects in baseball. He debuted in the major leagues in 2007 as a starting pitcher and quickly demonstrated his potential with a bid for a no-hitter in only his second MLB start. However, injury cut short his outing, as well as significant portions of his 2007 and 2008 seasons. Hughes began 2009 in the minors but later returned to the majors, eventually becoming a relief pitcher in June and pitching as a setup man for Mariano Rivera. Hughes excelled in the new role during the regular season. Despite his struggles in the postseason, Hughes won a championship with the Yankees in the 2009 World Series over the Philadelphia Phillies.

Upon returning to the Yankees' starting rotation in 2010, Hughes won 18 games and earned a berth on the American League All-Star team. Arm fatigue cost Hughes nearly half of the season in 2011. The following year, he stayed healthy for the entire season and won 16 games as the Yankees' third starter. In 2013, Hughes had his worst season, posting a 4–14 win–loss record and a 5.19 earned run average; this performance led to his removal from the starting rotation. After signing with the Minnesota Twins, Hughes had a turnaround season in 2014, finishing the season with a 16–10 record and an ERA of 3.52 and placing seventh in the American League Cy Young Award voting. Hughes ended his career with an 88–79 record and an earned run average of 4.52.

== Early life ==
Hughes was born in Mission Viejo, California on June 24, 1986, and attended Foothill High School in North Tustin, California, where he was a first-team High School All-American pitcher and had one perfect game. In his junior year (2003), he had a 12–0 record and posted an 0.78 earned run average (ERA) while striking out 85 batters in 72 innings. In his senior year (2004), he had an 0.69 ERA and a 9–1 record. In 61 innings, he gave up 41 hits and three walks while striking out 83 batters.

Hughes first committed to Santa Clara University, but he chose to sign with the New York Yankees when they selected him in the first round, with the 23rd overall selection, of the 2004 Major League Baseball draft. The Yankees were awarded this pick as compensation when free agent pitcher Andy Pettitte signed with the Houston Astros.

== Professional baseball career ==
=== Minor leagues ===
In 2004, Hughes pitched five scoreless innings for the rookie Gulf Coast League Yankees, striking out eight hitters. He spent 2005, his first full professional year, between the Class A Charleston RiverDogs and the Advanced A Tampa Yankees. He had a 9–2 record and a 1.24 ERA, and in 85 1/3 innings he gave up 54 hits while striking out 93.

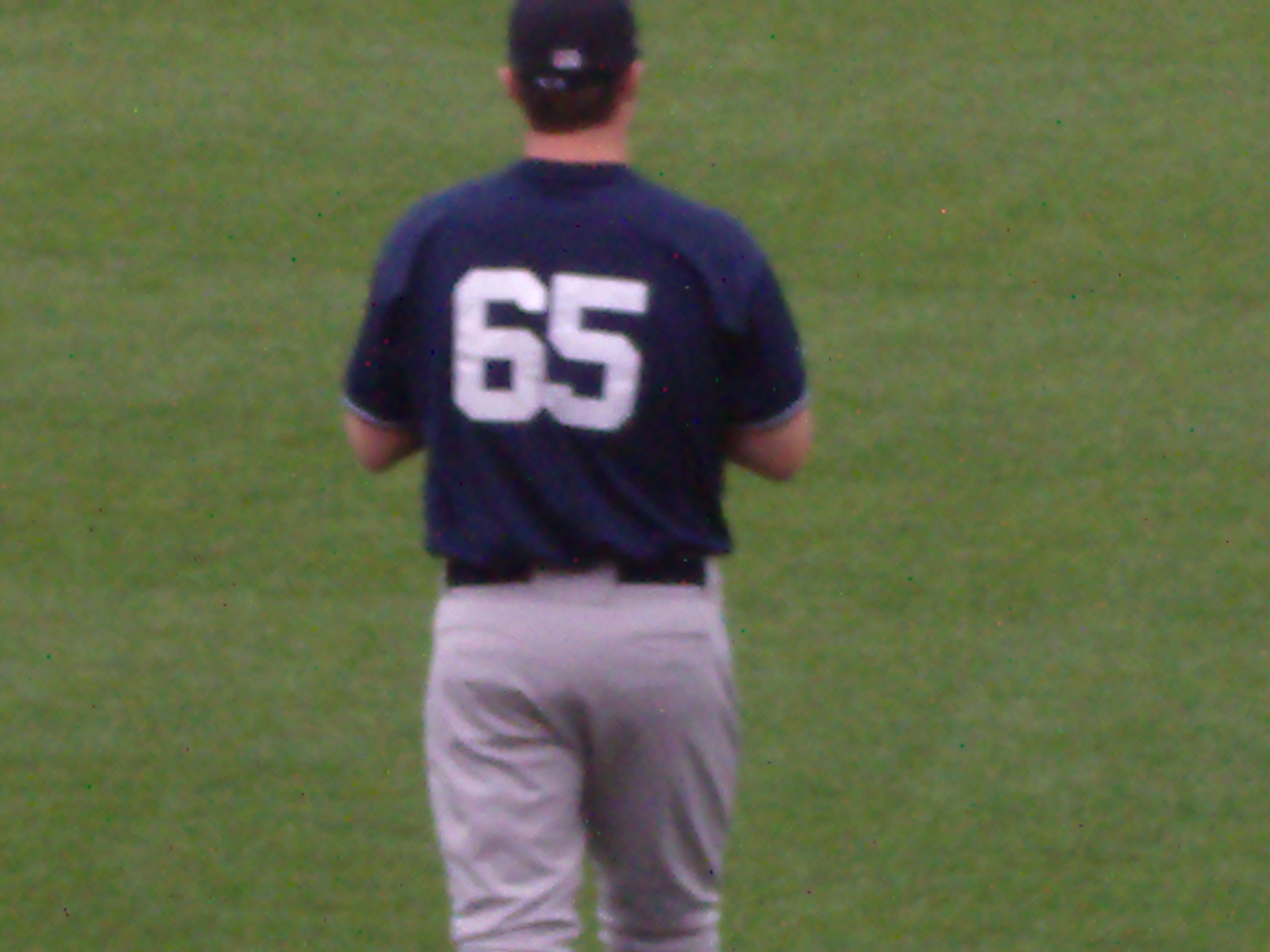
Hughes with the Scranton/Wilkes-Barre Yankees

After attending spring training with the Yankees in 2006, Hughes began the season with Tampa. He was promoted to the Double-A Trenton Thunder of the Eastern League at the beginning of May after he had a 2–3 record and a 1.80 ERA with Tampa while striking out 30 batters in 30 innings.

On June 13, Hughes took a no-hitter into the sixth inning and threw a one-hitter through seven innings in a 3–0 victory over the New Hampshire Fisher Cats. Ten days later, he put forth another dominant start, taking a no-hitter into the eighth inning and pitching eight shutout innings in a 4–0 win over the Connecticut Defenders. With Trenton, Hughes had a 10–3 record, a 2.25 ERA, and 138 strikeouts in 116 innings. He made one appearance in the Eastern League playoffs, earning a no-decision after pitching six innings of 1-run ball with 13 strikeouts. After the season, he won the Kevin Lawn "Pitcher of the Year" Award as the top Yankees' minor league pitcher.

Entering 2007, Baseball America rated Hughes the Yankees' #1 prospect, said he had the best curveball and best control in the Yankee system, and called him "arguably the best pitching prospect in the minors." Baseball America also named him the fourth-best prospect in baseball. MiLB.com named Hughes the top right-handed starting pitching prospect in the AL East farm systems. In January 2007, the Yankees announced that Hughes was being invited to spring training. According to Bryan Hoch of MLB.com, scouts believed that Hughes was ready for the major leagues. Hughes began 2007 pitching for the Triple-A Scranton/Wilkes-Barre Yankees of the International League (IL).

=== New York Yankees ===
==== 2007 ====
Following injuries to several Yankees' starters in 2007, Hughes was called up to the major leagues in April. Hughes made his major league debut on April 26 against the Toronto Blue Jays. In 4 1/3 innings, he allowed four runs on seven hits, earning his first career loss. In his second major league start on May 1 against the Texas Rangers, he was maintaining a no-hitter through 6 1/3 innings before pulling his left hamstring while facing his future teammate Mark Teixeira. Mike Myers later allowed a hit, but Hughes earned his first career win. After the game, he was placed on the disabled list (DL). He returned on August 4 against the Kansas City Royals, allowing six runs in 4 2/3 innings and earning a no-decision in a 16–8 victory. In his final start of the year, on September 27 against the Tampa Bay Devil Rays, he allowed one run in a season-high seven innings and earned the win in a 3–1 victory. In 17 starts for the Yankees, Hughes had a 5–3 record, a 4.46 ERA, and 58 strikeouts in 72 2/3 innings pitched. He was the second-youngest American League (AL) player in 2007.

Hughes was included on the Yankees' postseason roster as a long reliever. He made his first postseason appearance in 2007 against the Cleveland Indians in the AL Division Series (ALDS), giving up one run in two innings in Game 1, a 12–3 loss. In Game 3, Hughes (the youngest player on the Yankees' roster) relieved an injured Roger Clemens (the oldest player on the roster) in the third inning and pitched 3 2/3 scoreless innings. He struck out four and earned his first playoff win. The Yankees were eliminated in four games in the series.

==== 2008 ====
Prior to the 2008 season, it was reported by numerous news sources that the Yankees were thinking of including Hughes in a trade to the Minnesota Twins for Johan Santana. The trade never happened; Santana was traded to the New York Mets instead.

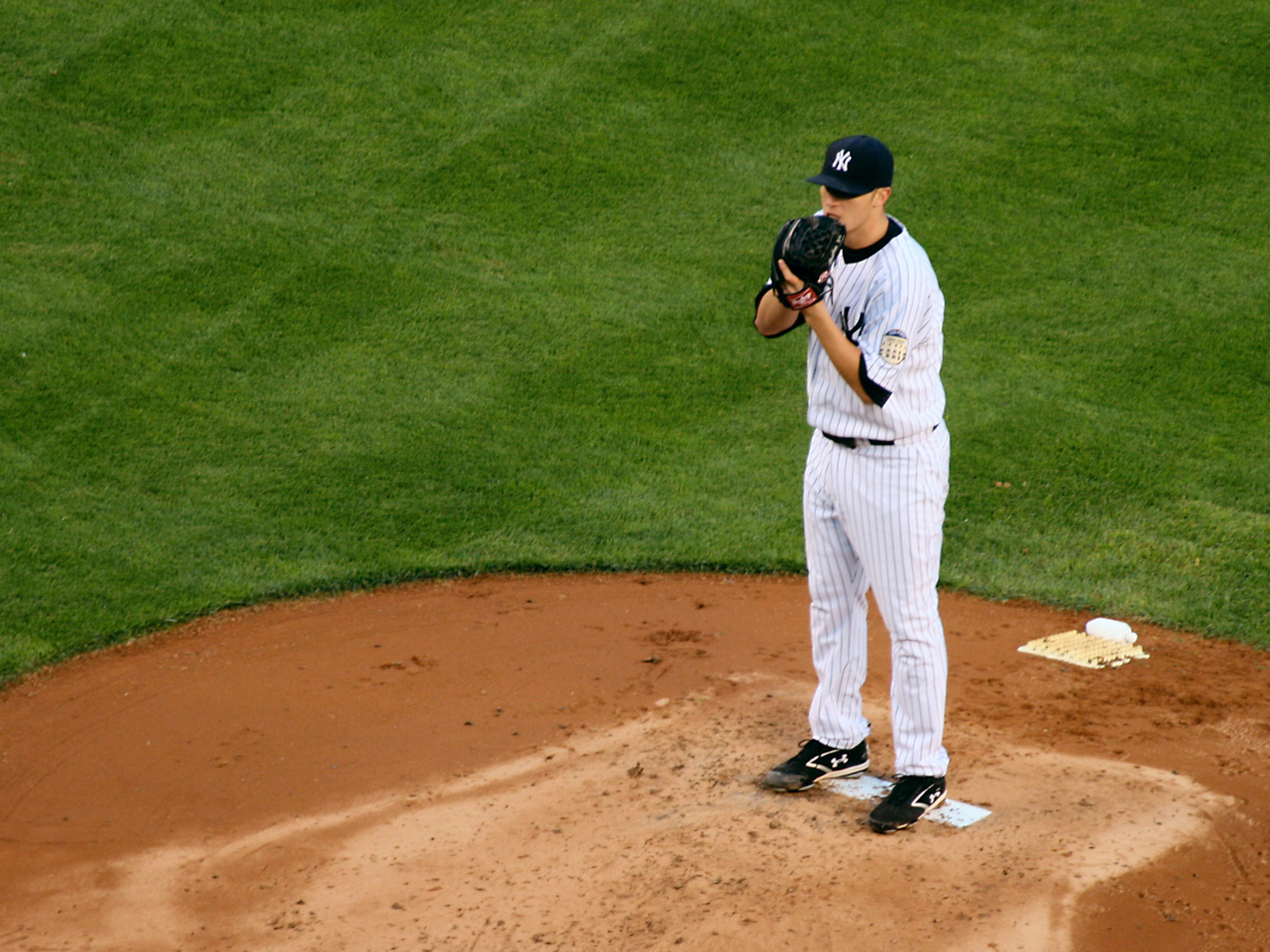
Hughes pitching in May 2008

Hughes began the 2008 season as the third starter in the Yankees' rotation. In his first six starts, he had an 0–4 record and a 9.00 ERA. On April 30, he was placed on the disabled list with a strained oblique and cracked rib. On a May 2 visit to an optometrist, Hughes was found to be slightly nearsighted.

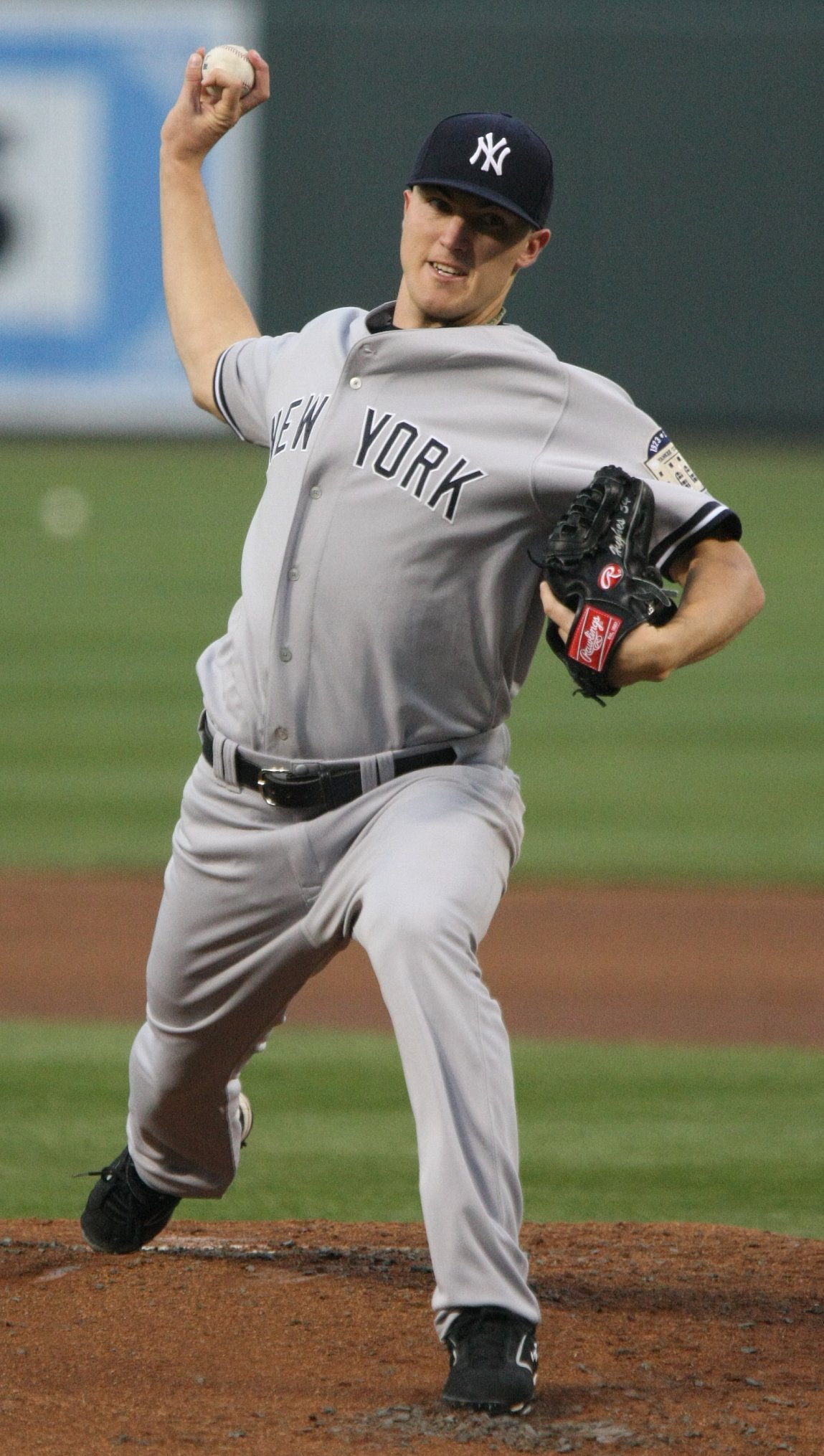
Hughes in 2008

After recovering from the rib injury, Hughes pitched for Scranton/Wilkes-Barre; he helped them win the 2008 International League title, earning the win after striking out 12 batters in the clinching game. On September 13, a day after the IL playoffs, Hughes was recalled by the Yankees. On September 17, Hughes made his first start since April 29, giving up one earned run over four innings and earning a no-decision in a 5–1 victory over the Chicago White Sox. In his final start of the season, on September 24, he gave up two runs in eight innings and received a no-decision in a ten-inning, 6–2 victory over Toronto. He finished the season with an 0–4 record, a 6.62 ERA, 23 strikeouts, and 34 innings pitched in eight starts. Because injuries severely limited his workload during the season, the Yankees sent Hughes to the Arizona Fall League after the season to pitch more innings.

==== 2009 ====
Although he had a solid performance in spring training, Hughes began the 2009 season in Triple-A. He was called up to the majors in April after Chien-Ming Wang was placed on the disabled list. Hughes made his first start of the season on April 28 against the Detroit Tigers and pitched six scoreless innings, earning his first win since 2007 in an 11–0 victory. On May 25, Hughes threw eight scoreless innings, earning the win in an 11–1 victory over the Rangers.

After he posted a 3–2 record and a 5.45 ERA in seven starts, Hughes was moved to the bullpen when Wang returned to the rotation in early June. Hughes pitched well, becoming the primary setup man to Mariano Rivera in July due to injuries to Brian Bruney and Dámaso Marte. Despite his success as a reliever, Cashman maintained that Hughes would be a starter over the long-term.

Hughes's first regular season win in relief came on July 17, when he threw two scoreless innings in a 5–3 victory over Detroit. On July 23, he recorded his first career save after a 6–3 Yankees victory over the Oakland Athletics. He relieved CC Sabathia in the eighth inning and pitched two perfect innings. From June 10 through July 3, he had a 25 1/3 inning scoreless streak, the longest by a Yankee reliever since Rivera had a 30 2/3 inning scoreless streak in 1999. In 44 games as a relief pitcher in 2009, Hughes posted a 1.40 ERA; he had 65 strikeouts in 51 1/3 innings.

Hughes pitched in all three games of the ALDS against the Minnesota Twins, posting a 9.00 ERA. In Game 5 of the AL Championship Series (ALCS) against the Los Angeles Angels of Anaheim, he suffered a loss when he gave up a run and also allowed an inherited runner to score in the 7–6 defeat. He had scoreless outings in Games 2 and 3 as the Yankees won the series in six games. He had a 16.20 ERA in the World Series, but he won his first World Series ring as the Yankees defeated the Philadelphia Phillies in six games.

==== 2010 ====
On March 25, 2010, Hughes was named the Yankees' fifth starter. Throughout the season, the Yankees occasionally had Hughes skip starts to limit his innings, in hopes that this would help him stay healthy. On April 21, Hughes carried a no-hitter into the eighth inning against the Athletics before allowing a leadoff single to Eric Chavez; he faced two more hitters prior to being relieved, having struck out 10 batters.

He won his first five decisions, a streak snapped May 22 by the New York Mets. He followed with another five-game win streak, the last coming against the Mets on June 19. After missing a start, he saw this win streak come to an end June 29 against the Seattle Mariners.

Hughes was named to the AL All-Star Team, Sunday, July 4. Five days after his first selection to the midsummer classic, Hughes threw seven innings and gave up one run to beat the Mariners 6–1. His next outing, the All-Star Game, did not go well. Hughes, after retiring the first batter he faced in the seventh inning, allowed a pair of singles to Scott Rolen and Matt Holliday before yielding to Matt Thornton; Rolen and Holliday scored the tying and go-ahead runs on Brian McCann's three-run double that proved decisive in the NL's 3–1 victory. On August 14, Hughes allowed three runs in six innings, earning the win in an 8–3 victory over the Kansas City Royals. Hughes had 18 wins (tied for fourth in the AL with Trevor Cahill and Justin Verlander behind Sabathia, who had 21, and Jon Lester and David Price, who both had 19), only 8 losses, and a 4.19 ERA while striking out 146 batters in 176 1/3 innings of work. His run support of 6.48 runs per game was the highest in the major leagues.

Hughes made his first postseason start in Game 3 of the ALDS against the Twins. He threw seven shutout innings to earn the win in the clinching game of the series as the Yankees beat the Twins 6–1. Game 2 of the ALCS against the Rangers did not go as well for Hughes, who allowed seven runs in four innings and earned the loss as the Yankees were defeated 7–2. He allowed four runs in 4 2/3 innings in Game 6 and earned another loss as the Yankees lost 6–1 and were eliminated from the postseason.

==== 2011 ====
Hughes began the 2011 season as the third starter in the Yankees rotation. He suffered from a dip in velocity, with his four-seam fastball decreasing to 89–92 miles per hour (143–148 km/h), compared to his previous 92–95 miles per hour (148–153 km/h). After opening the season 0–1 with a 13.94 ERA in three starts, Hughes was placed on the DL due to a dead arm syndrome. It was later revealed that Hughes had been suffering from shoulder inflammation. He underwent an arm strength rehabilitation program for several weeks. On July 6, he made his first start in nearly 3 months, pitching five innings, allowing two earned runs, striking out and walking two batters, in a 5–3 loss to the Cleveland Indians. On August 2, in a rain-shortened game, Hughes threw his first career shutout as the Yankees defeated the White Sox 6–0 in six innings. Late in September, Hughes was moved to the bullpen after back stiffness caused him to miss a start. In 17 games (14 starts), Hughes had a 5–5 record, a 5.79 ERA, and 47 strikeouts in 74 2/3 innings pitched.

Hughes was included on the Yankees' postseason roster as a relief pitcher. He had scoreless outings in Games 4 and 5 of the ALDS as the Yankees were defeated by the Detroit Tigers in five games.

==== 2012 ====
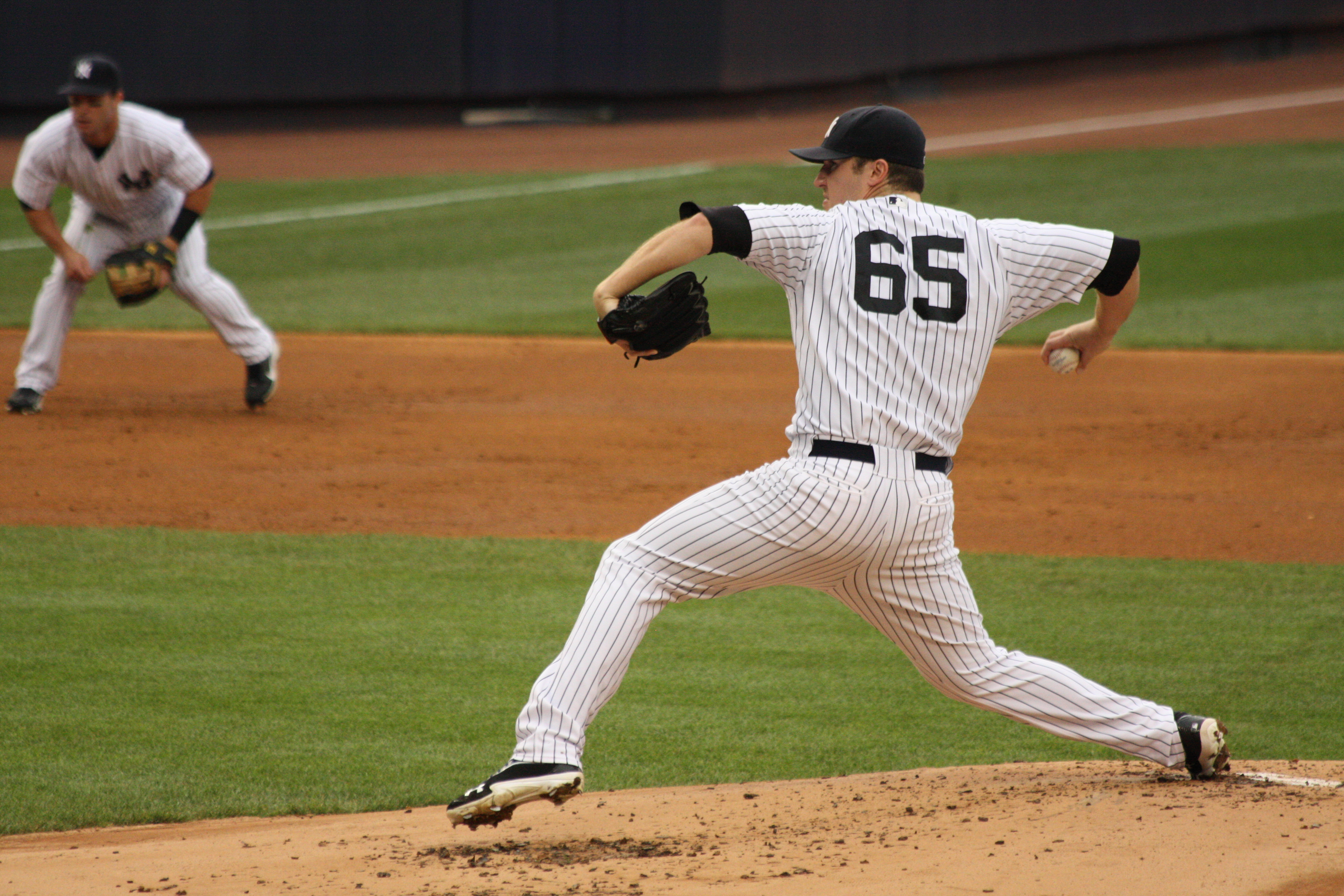
Hughes on August 1, 2012

On January 16, 2012, Hughes signed a one-year deal worth $3.25 million that included incentives, effectively avoiding arbitration. His deal was a $500,000 raise from his 2011 season.

Hughes was the Yankees' third starter in 2012. He started the season averaging only four innings in his first four starts while posting a 1–3 record and a 7.88 ERA. From May to the end of the season, however, Hughes had a 15–10 record and a 3.90 ERA. He had a season-high four-game winning streak from May 22 through June 15. Hughes threw a complete game on June 3, allowing one run in a 5–1 win against the Tigers. On June 26, he threw eight shutout innings and earned the win in a 6–4 victory over Cleveland. He threw 7 1/3 shutout innings and earned the win on September 13 in a 2–0 victory over the Boston Red Sox. In 32 starts, Hughes had a 4.19 ERA and 165 strikeouts in 191 1/3 innings pitched. He was tied for sixth in the AL in wins (16, with Max Scherzer, Yu Darvish, and Hiroki Kuroda), but he also tied for eighth in the league in losses (13, with Dan Haren and Ervin Santana).

In Game 4 of the ALDS against the Baltimore Orioles, Hughes allowed one run in 6 2/3 innings but received a no-decision in a 13-inning, 2–1 loss. The Yankees won the series in five games. In Game 3 of the ALCS against Detroit, Hughes allowed one run in three innings before exiting with back stiffness; he took the loss as the Yankees lost 2–1. The Tigers swept the Yankees in four games.

==== 2013 ====
Hughes began the 2013 season on the DL with a bulging disc in his back. He returned from the DL on April 6, allowing four runs (three earned) in four plus innings and earning the loss as Detroit won 8–4. On May 15 against the Seattle Mariners, Hughes only lasted 2/3 of an inning after giving up seven runs, six hits, two walks, including a grand slam to former Yankee Raúl Ibañez in a 12–2 Yankee loss. It was the shortest start of his career and at the time the shortest non-injury start by a Yankee at the new Yankee Stadium.

After Hughes pitched to a 4–13 record and a 4.86 ERA, with a 5.71 ERA in the second half, the Yankees removed Hughes from the rotation on September 4. Hughes went 1–10 in home starts in 2013, making him just the second MLB pitcher to win fewer than two games when making at least 15 home starts in a season. He became a free agent following the season.

=== Minnesota Twins ===
==== 2014 ====
Hughes agreed to a three-year contract worth $24 million with the Minnesota Twins on November 30, 2013. The deal was confirmed by the Twins on December 5, 2013. His first start for the Twins came against the White Sox in Chicago on April 3. Hughes threw five innings, giving up four earned runs and striking out seven. He received a no-decision as the Twins won the game 10-9. His first win in a Twins uniform came in his fourth start, where he limited the Kansas City Royals to three earned runs over six innings in an 8-3 victory on April 20.

Hughes emerged as the Twins' ace in 2014. On June 1, Hughes faced the Yankees for the first time in his career, pitching at Yankee Stadium for the first time since signing with the Twins. Hughes delivered, giving up just two earned runs on three hits across eight innings and earning the win in a 7-2 victory. Three starts later, he pitched his first complete game in over two years, throwing eight innings of two-run ball in a tough loss against the Red Sox in Boston. On September 13, Hughes struck out a career-high 11 batters over seven plus innings in a 5-1 loss to the White Sox, becoming the first Twins pitcher to strike out 10 or more batters in a single game in over two years.

Hughes finished the 2014 season with a win–loss record of 16–10 alongside a career-best 3.52 ERA and 1.13 WHIP. He topped the 200-inning threshold for the first time in his career, pitching 209 2/3 innings (10th-most in the AL) in 32 starts. Hughes struck out a career-high 186 batters to go against a measly 16 walks, the fewest ever for a pitcher with more than 200 innings. He also set a new record for the best strikeout-to-walk ratio posted by a starting pitcher in a single season in MLB history (11.625), breaking the previous record of 11.000 set by Bret Saberhagen 20 years earlier.

Hughes received both of the Twins' most prestigious player awards (the Joseph W. Haynes Pitcher of the Year Award and the Calvin R. Griffith MVP Award) for his performance throughout the season on an otherwise disappointing Twins team that finished last in the AL Central Division. He also finished seventh in the voting for the American League Cy Young Award. On December 22, 2014, Hughes and the Twins agreed on a three-year extension worth $42 million.

==== 2015 ====
Hughes was the Twins' Opening Day starter in 2015, losing 4-0 to the Detroit Tigers. During the 2015 season, Hughes's performance regressed. In August, he was placed on the disabled list with back problems. For the season, Hughes had an 11-9 record and an ERA of 4.40. In addition, he allowed 29 home runs in 155 1/3 innings, the highest total in major league baseball.

==== 2016 ====
On June 9, 2016, Hughes was struck in the left knee off a line drive from J. T. Realmuto and left the game. The next day, he was placed on the 15-day disabled list due to left knee contusion. On June 11, it was revealed that there was a non-displaced fracture of the femur in the left knee. He was ruled out for 6–8 weeks. On June 12, he was transferred to the 60-day disabled list. On June 28, Hughes' season was declared over as he required season-ending surgery for thoracic outlet syndrome. He finished the 2016 season with a 1–7 record and a 5.95 ERA.

==== 2017 ====
For the 2017 season, Hughes began the season as the Twins fourth starter. He went on the disabled list at the end of May due to biceps tendinitis. Upon his return from the disabled list, due to not being able to regain his complete stamina, Hughes agreed to head to the bullpen to build up strength. On July 18, Hughes was declared out for the season due to recurring symptoms of thoracic syndrome.

==== 2018 ====
Hughes was in the rotation at the beginning of the season. After two starts, he landed on the disabled list. Upon his return, he was sent to the bullpen. Hughes was designated for assignment by the Twins on May 22, 2018. Hughes ended his five-year stint with the Twins with a 32–29 record and a 4.43 ERA.

=== San Diego Padres ===
On May 27, 2018, the Twins traded Hughes, along with cash and the 74th pick in the 2018 MLB draft, to the San Diego Padres in exchange for minor-league catcher Janigson Villalobos. Upon being acquired, he was put in the bullpen. Hughes pitched to a 6.10 ERA in 20 2/3 innings. The Padres designated Hughes for assignment on August 10 and released him on August 16.

On January 3, 2021, Hughes officially announced his retirement from professional baseball on his Twitter account.

=== Scouting report ===
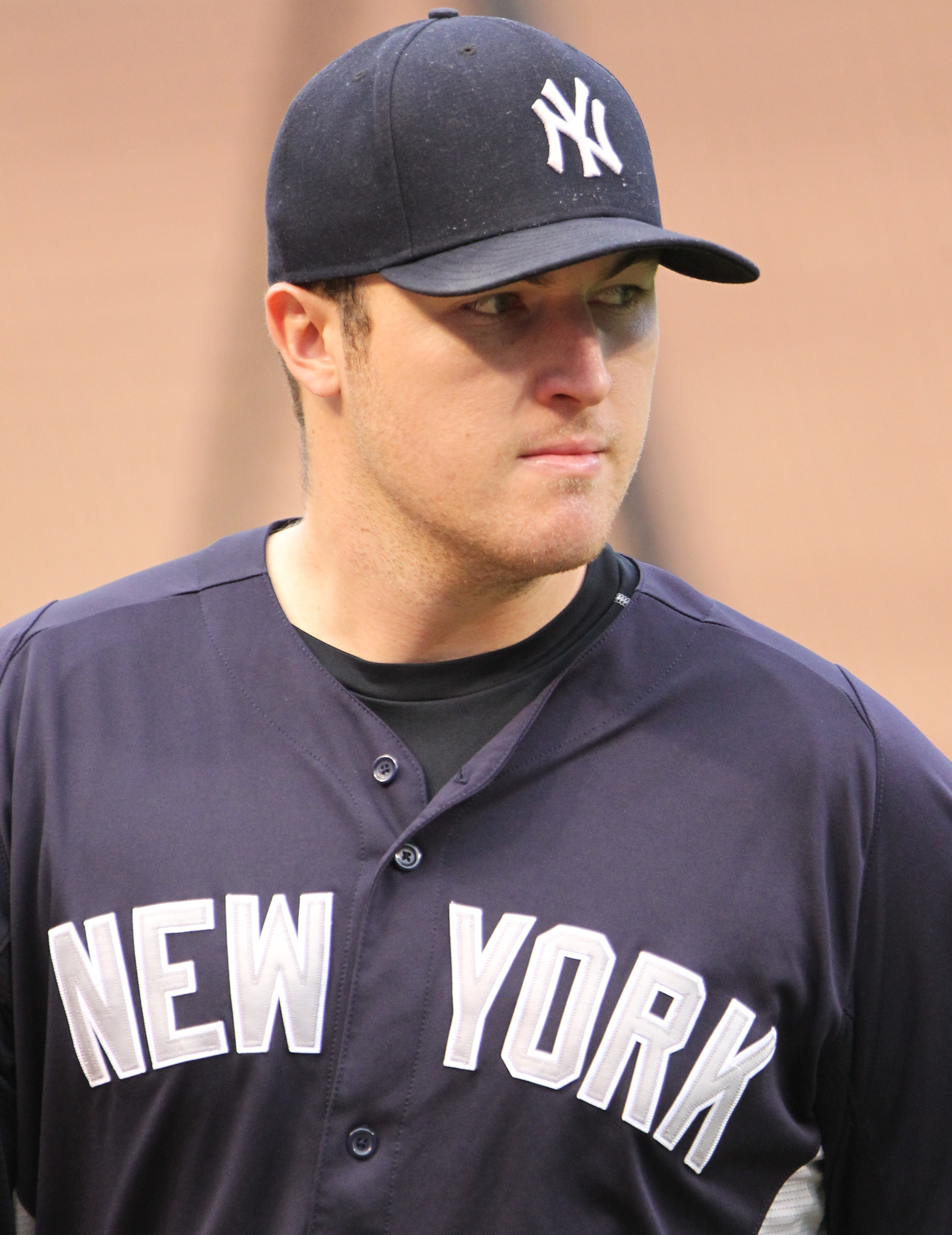
Hughes in 2011

Hughes's pitch repertoire varied over the years, although his main pitch was a four-seam fastball at 92–95 mph. He also relied on a spike curveball in the range of 73–77 mph. Hughes developed a mid-80s Vulcan changeup against left-handed hitters. Hughes added a cut fastball in the high 80s as a weapon against right-handers in the 2008 season, and he used the pitch 16% of the time in the 2009 and 2010 seasons:

It was something I was messing around with in rehab and figured could be a good equalizing pitch in fastball counts. It was basically a way to get some cheap outs. It was also a pitch that was easier for me to control than a slider. It's just a fastball grip with a little alteration, so it was easier for me to throw strikes with it. That was kind of the purpose to adding it in.

Hughes asserted that a hamstring injury he suffered in his rookie year permanently altered his pitching mechanics: "My stride, and things like that, have never quite been the same."

In early 2011, Hughes's fastball velocity had dropped by several miles per hour. Hughes continued to use the cutter into the start of the 2012 season; he posted a 7.88 ERA in April, throwing the cutter about 12% of the time in this span. In early May, Hughes dropped the cutter from his repertoire, using it only 1.2% of the time for the rest of the year.

In mid-2012, Hughes developed a low-80s slider that he used against right-handers.

Hughes threw a disproportionate number of his pitches high in the strike zone and above the zone.

=== Awards and honors ===
- 2004 – 1st team High School All-American P
- 2006 – New York Yankees Minor League Player of the Year
- 2007 – AL East Division Top Prospects (Right-handed starting pitcher)
- 2007 – Baseball America's Top 100 prospects: #4.
- 2009 – World Series champion
- 2010 – American League All-Star

== Personal life ==
Hughes and his wife, Sarah, were married in November 2016. They welcomed their first child, a baby boy named Harrison, in the fall of 2019.

Hughes is a Christian. His baseball glove has the reference for the Bible verse Philippians 4:13 on it, and Hughes has the entire verse ("I can do all things through Christ who strengthens me.") tattooed on his left arm.

As a child, Hughes was a Boston Red Sox fan. He had a poster of Nomar Garciaparra with the slogan "Reverse the Curse" on his bedroom wall.

Hughes enjoys watching the Food Network and is a fan of Alton Brown. He became a fan of the Tampa Bay Lightning in 2005, after he began training at the Yankees' facility in Tampa.

Hughes is an avid sports card collector. Since September 2019, he has recorded and published videos of himself opening packs to YouTube under the channel name Phil’s Pulls. However, that channel's last video to date was uploaded on March 20, 2023, indicating that the channel is no longer active.

== See also ==
- List of Major League Baseball single-inning strikeout leaders
