= DVB 3D-TV =

Digital broadcasting standard

Logo

DVB 3D-TV is a deprecated standard that partially came out at the end of 2010 which included techniques and procedures to send a three-dimensional video signal through actual DVB transmission standards (cable, terrestrial or satellite). There was a commercial requirement text for 3D TV broadcasters and set-top box manufacturers, but no technical information was in there.

3D television technology was already in its first steps regarding its standardization, the major 3D market was in theaters and Blu-ray Disc players with stereoscopic systems, but in the near future it could be extended to diffusion, and later free viewpoint television will come into our homes, which mean the need of new coding and transmission standards.

== Implementation ==
The implementation of first generation of DVB 3D-TV could be staggered:

- Phase 1: the first standard will have forward compatibility with actual HD systems with just some firmware actualization at HD systems set-top boxes and, of course, the need for 3D panels; however signaling or distribution formats should not prevent future expansion to support new 3D encoding formats. This system only works with stereoscopic Frame sequential 3D systems. Requirements for this system, which is called Frame compatible format, are included in the commercial requirements of DVB. Some broadcasters like Sky3D or Canal+3D are already using this technology, which is largely thought for PayTV.
- Phase 2: the use of new broadcasting requirements for specific 3D streams won't be compatible with actual 3D STB, but it would be service compatible with 2D STB if no specific 3D STB is available by using Scalable Video Coding and Multiview Video Coding techniques, i.e. not having to simulcast 2D and 3D and occupying only one channel by using a unique video stream with a normal 2D base stream and an adjustable 3D depth layer. This system is called service compatible and is designed for Free-to-air group of broadcasters.

== 3DTV signals ==
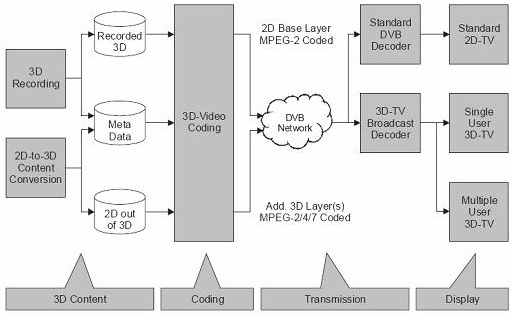
Diagram of an CSC or FCC 3DTV system

Matrix of signal formats for 3DTV:

Compatibility level	1st generation 3DTV	2nd generation 3DTV	3rd generation 3DTV
Level 4: HD service compatible (CSC)	2D HD + MVC (L, R formed by matrixing: depth info)	2D HD + MVC (Depth, occlusion and transparency data)	
Level 3: HD Frame compatible compatible (FCC)	Frame compatible + MPEG resolution extension (ex. SVC)		
Level 2: Conventional HD Frame compatible (CFC)	L and R in same HD frame		
Level 1: Conventional HD display compatible (CDC)	Color anaglyph		

=== Frame sequential ===
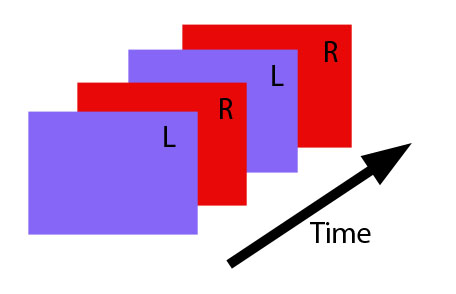
Frame sequential 3D video

Regarding how a signal once it's decoded is sent to the display, current stereoscopic systems use a frame-sequential 3D signal. Left and right frames are sent alternately to the display and by diverse systems like shuttered glasses or polarized glasses are then shown to each eye. This involves that the real frame frequency halves the video frame frequency.

== Technical features ==
=== Frame compatible ===
In Phase 1 system, only frame-sequential 3D is allowed, using frame compatible (CFC) format. This is made by a spatial multiplex that combines the left and right video sequences in one HD stream which is coded with H.264 as a single image. This allows to handle video as normal HD video using typical channels and interfaces like HDMI, which is possible in this 1.4a version. Frame compatible (CFC) model is also compatible with 2D HD mode in the same channel, adding some signalling for switching from 2D to 3D.

There are basically two ways to do spatial multiplex: Side by side and Top and bottom, but additional spatial multiplex formats have been proposed in order to improve picture quality by providing a better balance between the V and H resolution.

=== Side by side ===
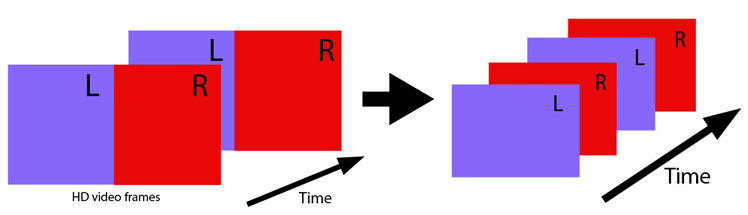
Side by side format

Side by side (SbS) format just put the left and right images one next to the other in an HD image. Because of this, a horizontal decimate is required which causes halving of horizontal definition. DVB 3D-TV supports following SbS formats:

1080i @ 50 Hz Side-by-Side
720p @ 50 Hz Side-by-Side
720p @ 59.94 / 60 Hz Side-by-Side
1080p @ 23.97 / 24 Hz Side-by-Side
1080i @ 59.94 / 60 Hz Side-by-Side

=== Top and bottom ===
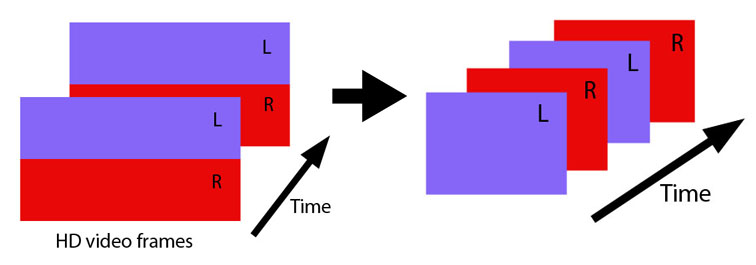
Top and bottom format

Top and Bottom (TaB) format put left and right images one above the other in a HD image. In this case, vertical decimate is required which causes halving of vertical definition. DVB 3D-TV supports following TaB formats:

1080p @ 23.97 / 24 Hz Top-and-Bottom
720p @ 59.94 / 60 Hz Top-and-Bottom

- Not every spatial multiplex format is frame compatible with actual systems. Following formats are non frame compatible:

720p @ 50 /60 Hz
1080p @ 24 Hz

=== Graphics and text ===
There are basically two types of text displayed on screen that need additional broadcasting information to be displayed on a 3D display:

- Subtitling: (or captions) are text and visual elements that can be overlaid on the picture. The reconstruction of the composite image which includes the captions needs to be done in the STB. Using standards for sub-titling already available for DVB broadcast systems, in addition to depth information provided by the broadcasters, the STB should position correctly the captions into the L and R pictures mixed with the original 3D image. The DVB 3D-TV subtitling solution will use existing DVB subtitling implementations and will be backward compatible with 2D streams.
- Service guide: the STB generates multimedia content such as EPG for his service guide, which combines the use of data preloaded into the receiver with data provided by the broadcaster, in the form of service information. Depth information will be extracted of the captions, displaying the graphics in the same depth.

=== Signaling ===
The main function of signaling for frame compatible 3DTV is to signal the presence of a 3D or 2D video stream. It must be also possible to include in the broadcast signal information about the pixel arrangement used to decimate the master HDTV full samples/line pictures to create the anamorphic version, if 3D is available. It's interesting to signal also for 3D receivers the 3D events that are available, for which 3D availability should appear on EPG. For future service compatible (CSC) 3DTV, signal that a 3D version of a 2D service or event is being simulcast, and vice versa will be needed.

== 3DTV broadcast in future ==
=== Multiview ===
Multiview video coding is a compression standard appended from H.264/MPEG-4 AVC which allows send stereoscopic 3D video without resolution loss due to spatial multiplex, and reducing overhead of sending 2 HD images up to 50% and in a single video stream. It is used in Blu-ray players, but at the moment it's not applicable to broadcast because of the processing time for encoding, which uses motion compensation algorithms. Nevertheless, there were some experiments with MVC 3D broadcast by Fraunhofer society over 2nd generation DVB (DVB-T2, DVB-C2 and DVB-S2).

=== Free viewpoint ===
Total Free viewpoint television can be reached by capturing multiple views and extracting 2D+depth information from them to create a 3D model of the scene. This system was being investigated, but the coding complexity and great bandwidth requirements make current broadcasting applications using Multiview Video Coding impractical, so a totally new compression scheme and capture techniques need to be investigated.

== See also ==
- 3D television
- DVB
- 3D display
- 3-D film
- Digital 3D
- Stereoscopic video coding
- 3D Blu-ray Disc
- EPG
- Free viewpoint television
- Multiview Video Coding
