= 3D@Home Consortium =

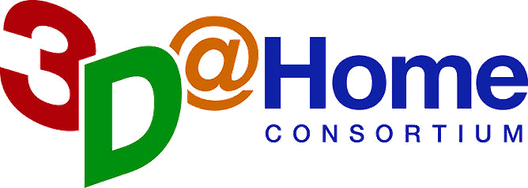
- 3D@Home Logo
- Formation: 2008
- Founder: 22 founding members
- Type: Non-profit consortium
- Purpose: Faster adoption of 3D systems at home
- Members: Over 50

3D@Home Consortium is a non-profit consortium focused on faster adoption of 3D systems at home through the development of technical roadmaps, consumer education, test and evaluation methodologies. The organization supports the development of industry standards being established by standards organizations.

The 3D@Home Consortium was founded in 2008 by 22 founding members, including digital media corporations like Disney, Philips, Samsung and Universal Studios. Today the alliance has over 50 member companies from more than 11 countries with representatives from the 3D eco-system spanning transmission, content creation, hardware and signaling companies. The organization's activities are carried out by five steering teams which cover the areas of content creation, distribution and transmission, education and communication, consumer products and a team dedicated to the effects of 3D TV on human physiology.

3D@Home is 3D technology-neutral among competing 3D technologies such as active-shutter, passive, color-coded or auto-stereo. According to the organization, over 1.4 million 3D TV capable TVs were sold the year the organization was founded, yet at the time, content for the home was limited. The organization has been quoted regarding the motivation of 3D content providers to bring 3D media into the home in order to offset the high cost of making 3D films.

3D@Home is managed by FlexTech Alliance, a not for profit organization promoting the development of a healthy display eco-system.

== History ==
- 2011 - The consortium signed a Memorandum of Understanding with the American Optometric Association (AOA) to share data and ensure eye health as it relates to 3D TV.
- 2010 - 3D@Home created a steering team focused on the effects of 3D entertainment on human physiology. The consortium leverages established relationships with 3DFIC in Korea, the 3DConsortium of Japan, C3D of China, and 3DIDA of Taiwan to ensure that the human factors activity covers the globe.
- 2010 – 3D@Home launched the consumer education site called 3D University, to help consumers learn more about 3D technology.
- 2009 – The company produced three documents to be used by Consumer Electronics Association (CEA) working groups to develop industry standards for 3D HDTVs. The documents pertain to requirements for digital interfaces, the active shutter glasses database and the passive glasses database.
- 2008 – The creation of the 3D@Home alliance was announced at the NAB Show, a popular digital media conference hosted by the National Association of Broadcasters.
