= China 3D TV Test Channel =

Chinese television channel

- Country: China
- Broadcast area: Mainland China
- Headquarters: Beijing

Ownership
- Owner: China Central Television; Beijing Media Network; Tianjin Television; Shanghai Media Group; Jiangsu Broadcasting Corporation; Shenzhen Media Group

History
- Launched: January 1, 2012
- Closed: July 30, 2018 (6 years, 210 days)
- Replaced by: CCTV-4K; CCTV-8K

Links
- Website: 3d.tv.cn

China 3D TV Test Channel (simplified Chinese: 中国3D电视试验频道; traditional Chinese: 中國3D電視試驗頻道; pinyin: Zhōngguó 3D diànshì shìyàn píndào) was a Chinese television channel which broadcast digital 3D television content from China Central Television, Beijing Television, Tianjin Television, Shanghai Media Group, Jiangsu Television and Shenzhen Media Group. It was launched on January 1, 2012, and was shut down on July 30, 2018, being replaced by CCTV-4K, a television channel which broadcasts 4K content solely from CCTV.
