= SENSIO Technologies =

Montreal company

SENSIO Technologies, Inc.
- Type: Public
- Traded as: TSX Venture Exchange: SIO
- Industry: stereoscopic image processing
- Founded: Montreal, Quebec, Canada (1999)
- Founder: Nicholas Routhier and Richard LaBerge
- Fate: Bankruptcy (2016)
- Headquarters: Brossard, Canada
- Area served: Worldwide
- Key people: Nicholas Routhier (President and CEO); Richard LaBerge (Executive Vice-President and CMO)
- Products: SENSIO® Hi-Fi 3D encoding and decoding technology, SENSIO® Autodetect, SENSIO® S2D Switch, Image enhancement technologies
- Website: www.sensio.tv

SENSIO Technologies, Inc., also known as SENSIO, was a Montreal company that developed and marketed stereoscopic image-processing technologies facilitating the creation and delivery of 3D content. To promote widespread 3D adoption, SENSIO was active on several fronts: aggregating and distributing 3D content in its SENSIO® Hi-Fi 3D format; supplying the technology to enable high-fidelity, quality-enhanced 3D images delivered over the existing 2D infrastructure; developing technologies that eased user interaction with 3D content; and ensuring compatibility by conforming to existing constraints and promoting standardization.

SENSIO's customers were in the consumer electronics industry, the digital-cinema equipment industry, the semiconductor industry and the broadcast equipment industry. Its partners were film studios and event promoters; broadcasters, signal and service providers; and cinema distributors and operators.

== History ==
=== 1999-2005 ===
SENSIO Technologies Inc. was founded in 1999 by Nicholas Routhier and Richard LaBerge, under the name of Technologies Sensorielles TEG, to manufacture technology capable of allowing 3D to be viewed in the home. Their research and development resulted, in 2002, in the first iteration of what was to become the SENSIO® Hi-Fi 3D technology – a spatial compression codec.

The codec was incorporated into a video processor set-top box – the SENSIO® S3D-100 – which earned a 2003 CES Design and Engineering Showcase Honors award. It was the first full-resolution consumer 3D product.

In addition, the codec was applied to encode a library of over 40 movies for which SENSIO had negotiated the rights with Hollywood and independent studios, in order to ensure that purchasers of the equipment had access to 3D content in the correct format. The constitution of this library resulted in the first ever Hollywood 3D film to be released on DVD: Dimension Films’ Spy Kids 3D: Game Over in 2005.

=== 2006-2008 ===
In 2006, the company became publicly listed under the name SENSIO Technologies Inc., offering stock for sale on the TSX Venture Exchange under the symbol SIO.

By 2007, SENSIO had discontinued the SENSIO® S3D-100 and was concentrating on providing intellectual property under licence. That year, it demonstrated the first live 3D solution for cinemas with a digital cinema server from International Datacasting that was used for the first satellite transmission of 3D content with Cinedigm (formerly known as AccessIT).

At the 2008 Consumer Electronics Show (CES), SENSIO demonstrated the first full HD 3D solution for home entertainment on HD 3D LCD and DLP televisions.

=== 2009-2011 ===
The business model for live 3D in cinemas that SENSIO and its various partners had developed resulted in the first live 3D event in cinemas in 2009: the BCS Bowl. Also that year, SENSIO supplied the technology for the first live 3D simulcast on multiple platforms – cinema, stadium screen and TV – the NCAA’s USC versus Ohio State championship football game broadcast by ESPN.

2009 also saw the DVD Forum recognize what was then called the SENSIO® 3D format in its 3D video specification – the first 3D technology to be standardized and the only one to be certified in that standard.

At the very end of 2009, just ahead of the release of James Cameron’s Avatar in cinemas, Ubisoft released James Cameron’s Avatar: The Game. This was the first console game using 3D graphics with stereoscopic effects. Avatar integrated SENSIO® Hi-Fi 3D technology, providing a Full-HD (1920 x 1080) S3D gaming experience for PlayStation 3 and Xbox 360 users.

In 2010, SENSIO® Hi-Fi 3D technology was selected by FIFA for the live 3D broadcast in cinemas of 25 key matches of the 2010 FIFA World Cup™ soccer championship. It was the first worldwide event of its kind. SENSIO federated cinema distributors and operators into what became known as the SENSIO® 3D Live Network, enabling spectators in 33 countries to see the matches in live 3D in 475 cinemas. As of April 2011, the network counts over 800 screens in 35 countries, and cinemas in the network have screened matches from the 2011 RBS Six Nations Rugby and 2011 NBA All-Star Weekend.

Also in 2010, SENSIO® Hi-Fi 3D became the first proprietary 3D format to be integrated into a 3DTV; it is in the entire line of HD LCD 3DTVs from Vizio, America's number-one LCD TV vendor.

At the end of that year, SENSIO acquired signal-processing technologies and key personnel from Algolith Inc. in order to expand its offer to the broadcast industry.

At the 2011 CES, SENSIO officially announced two new technologies aimed at improving the overall (professional or consumer) user experience – SENSIO® S2D Switch and SENSIO® Autodetect – as well as a new content solution, the SENSIO® Hi-Fi 3D Content Library available over video-on-demand (VOD).

Although it has been in business for more than a decade, SENSIO never made any profit. It relied mostly on new investment to continue operating. The interest in 3D from 2010 going forward did translate in stronger sales, but it fell short of the revenues needed to survive in the long term.

=== Liquidity crisis and bankruptcy (2015-2016) ===
Over the course of 2015, SENSIO attempted to raise financing from its largest shareholder as well as by way of private placement of shares. However, these attempts proved unsuccessful, causing SENSIO to experience a liquidity crisis. In November 2015, SENSIO engaged a financial advisor to provide financial consulting services in order to initiate a divestiture process. On December 23, 2015, SENSIO executed a letter of intent, selling its rights, title and interest in some of its intellectual properties to 3DN LLC, a subsidiary of Ottawa-based technology development and intellectual property licensing company WiLAN. On the same day, following the execution of the LOI, the company also filed a Notice of Intention to Make a Proposal under the Canadian Bankruptcy and Insolvency Act. In the press release announcing the sales process and NOI, SENSIO also revealed that Sensio's Board of Director thanked Mr. Richard LaBerge, co-founder of Sensio, for his years of service to the Corporation, and will not be replaced.

Over the following weeks, SENSIO attempted to find a buyer for its remaining assets, namely its 3DGO! online rental service. During winter 2016, the company filed two motions for an order to extend the stay period, in order to buy some time to complete the sales process. However, their attempts were unsuccessful; the 3DGO! service was discontinued on April 15, 2016 and on April 22, 2016, SENSIO did not request a further extension, and was deemed to have filed an assignment in bankruptcy. The trustee's preliminary report to creditors, filed in May 2016, reveals that SENSIO's remaining assets at the time of the bankruptcy were the 3DGO application, database and trademark, as well as computer equipment.

== Technologies ==
=== Spatial compression ===
SENSIO® Hi-Fi 3D is a set of technologies, composed of the SENSIO® 3D Encoder and the SENSIO® 3D Decoder, which provides maximum fidelity to the original 3D image through a unique and established method of quincunx subsampling combined with reconstruction algorithms that interpolate the missing data to a high level of accuracy. It is incorporated into video products for 3D production, delivery and viewing, and produces a level of fidelity to the original image that is indistinguishable to the naked eye, even at the lowest bitrates.

=== Usability ===
SENSIO® Autodetect is a feature that can be integrated into 3DTVs and other displays (production monitors, for example) to automatically detect the input format of a video stream, whether 2D or frame-compatible 3D (side-by-side, top-and-bottom and SENSIO® Hi Fi 3D), and signal it to the decoder for automated expansion. This feature simplifies interaction with the 3D technology, rendering it transparent. In other words, they do not have to ascertain in advance whether they are watching 2D or 3D and what type, and then navigate through on-screen menus to select the appropriate format.

SENSIO® S2D Switch enables users to switch viewing mode of a 3D feed from 3D to 2D or between different 3D view modes. It supports the most popular frame-compatible formats covered by HDMI 1.4a and used by service providers supporting 3D today: side-by-side (SbS), over/under (TaB), checkerboard and SENSIO® Hi-Fi 3D.

== Summary of SENSIO firsts ==
- First full-resolution consumer 3D product: anaglyph, page flip and 2D (2003)
- First demonstration of multi-output playback from a single source (2004)
- First release of Hollywood movies in 3D and on DVD: first title was Dimension Films’ Spy Kids 3D (2005)
- First live 3D solution demonstrated with International Datacasting (2007)
- First satellite transmission of 3D content with Cinedigm (2007)
- First full HD 3D solution (2008)
- First live 3D event in cinemas: BCS Bowl (American) football (2009)
- First live 3D simulcast on multiple platforms – cinema, stadium and home – with ESPN: NCAA's USC vs. Ohio State (American) football game (2009)
- First 3D console game with stereoscopic 3D effects: James Cameron’s Avatar: The Game by Ubisoft (2009)
- First worldwide live 3D event in cinemas: 2010 FIFA World Cup (2010)
- First 3D technology to be standardized – DVD Forum (2009)
- First proprietary 3D format to be integrated into a 3DTV – Vizio's XVT series (2010)

(Source: SENSIO's corporate profile)
