= Real Time Race =

- Company type: (Limited company)
- Industry: Computer Graphics
- Founded: 2003
- Key people: Christopher Leigh, Chief Executive; Dr Roderick Kennedy, Technology Officer
- Products: iFlex and vFit
- Number of employees: 10 (approx.)
- Website: corporate.realtimerace.com

Real Time Race Limited is a company based at Daresbury Laboratory in North West England. The company was Founded in 2003 by Christopher Leigh and Stuart Scott-Goldstone.

In 2008, Real Time Race worked with Malaysian owned Lotus Cars to test a video capture vehicle. It was fitted with a rotating drum containing 64 lasers for Lidar, a Global Positioning System, an Inertial navigation system and 5 high definition cameras.

== Technology ==
=== iFlex ===
In 2009, Dr Roderick Kennedy and Christopher Leigh invented a Free viewpoint television technology called iFlex which used the captured data from a moving platform. The optical graphics engine, based on image-based modeling and rendering produces an immersive video environment. This is used, amongst other applications, in race car simulation.

=== vFit ===
Real Time Race also claims to have augmented iFlex with live real world objects instead of Computer-Generated Imagery. vFit is the artificial intelligence system allowing realistic physics and collision interaction between the real and virtual objects.

== Development ==
Real Time Race stated its intention to use the technology for interactive television motor racing in 2010. In a televised interview for BBC Click Mark Wilkin, Formula One editor of the BBC, commented that viewers wanted something more sophisticated than CGI video games. He said he will be interested to see how the system would handle collisions.
