= Sky 3D (Italian TV channel) =

- Broadcast area: Italy
- Network: Sky Italia

Programming
- Language: Italian
- Picture format: 1080i (3DTV)

Ownership
- Owner: Sky Italia Sky plc

History
- Launched: 6 September 2011; 14 years ago
- Closed: 15 January 2018; 8 years ago

Links
- Website: www.sky.it/3d

Sky 3D was a 3D television channel on the Sky platform, that launched on 6 September 2011 with the film Winx Club 3D: Magical Adventure. The channel broadcasts a mixture of movies, entertainment and sport for 12 hours a day from 01:00 pm to 01:00 am GMT.

== History ==
On 11 January 2016, Sky 3D modified the logo to conform to the British TV channel of the same name.

From 8 to 16 October 2016 the channel was entirely dedicated to 3D cinema to remember the ancient films of the history of cinema in 3D.

In December 2017, Sky announced that the channel will only be available on demand from January 2018. The dedicated Sky 3D TV channel closed on 15 January 2018 and programming will only be available on Sky On Demand.
