= 3D television =

Television that conveys depth perception to the viewer

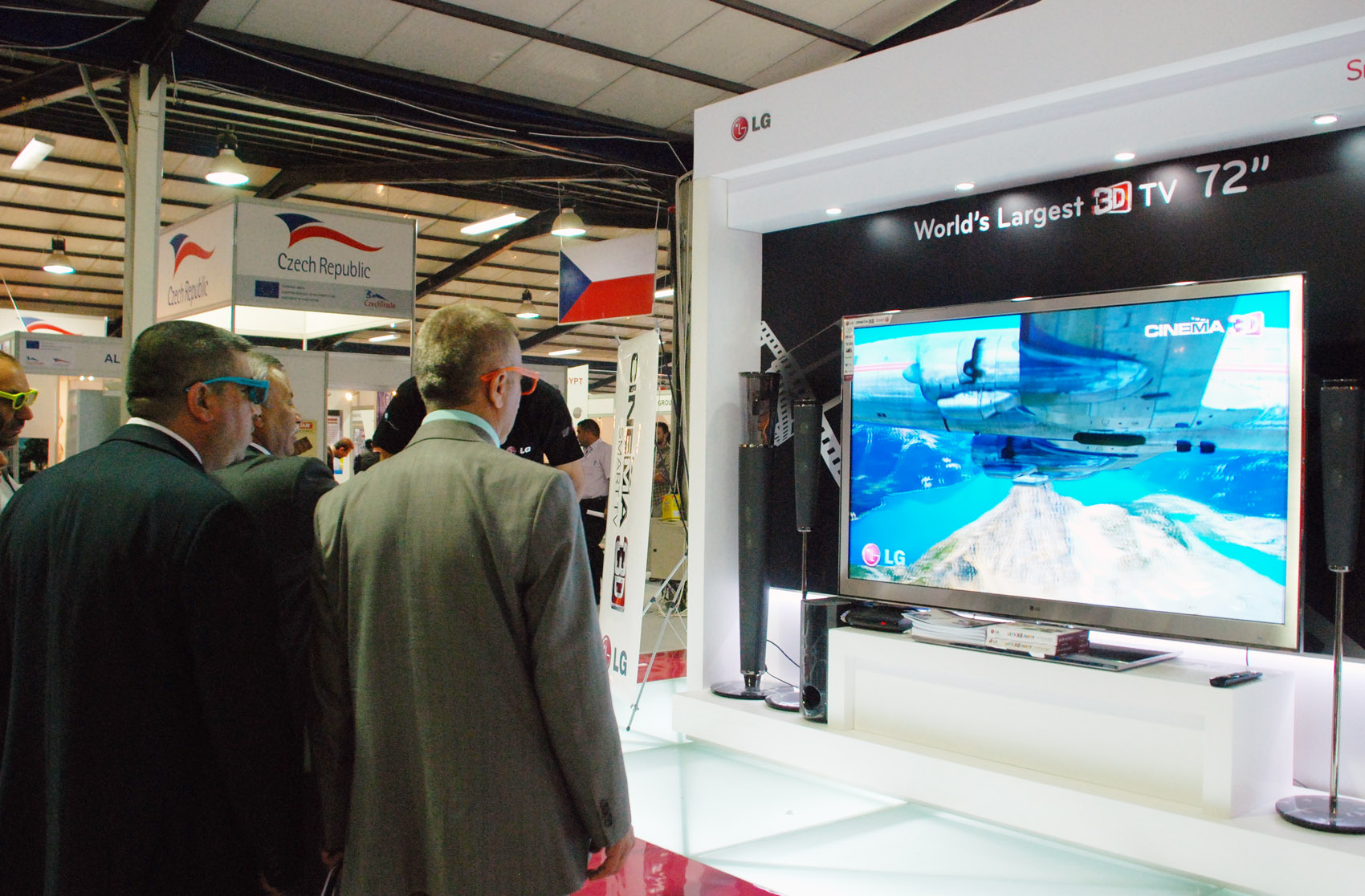
A 3D television being showcased at a trade show.

3D television (3DTV) is a type of television that conveys depth perception to the viewer by employing techniques such as stereoscopic display, multi-view display, or any other form of 3D display. Most modern 3D television sets use an active shutter 3D system or a polarized 3D system, and some are autostereoscopic without the need of glasses. As of 2017, most 3D TV sets and services are no longer available from manufacturers.

== History ==
The stereoscope was first invented by Sir Charles Wheatstone in 1838. It showed that when two pictures are viewed stereoscopically, they are combined by the brain to produce 3D depth perception. The stereoscope was improved by Louis Jules Duboscq, and a famous picture of Queen Victoria was displayed at The Great Exhibition in 1851. In 1855 the Kinematoscope was invented. In the late 1890s, the British film pioneer William Friese-Greene filed a patent for a 3D movie process. On 10 June 1915, former Edison Studios chief director Edwin S. Porter and William E. Waddell presented tests in red-green anaglyph to an audience at the Astor Theater in New York City and in 1922 the first public 3D movie The Power of Love was displayed.

Stereoscopic 3D television was demonstrated for the first time on 10 August 1928, by John Logie Baird in his company's premises at 133 Long Acre, London. Baird pioneered a variety of 3D television systems using electro-mechanical and cathode-ray tube techniques. The first 3D TV was produced in 1935, and stereoscopic 3D still cameras for personal use had already become fairly common by the Second World War. Many 3D movies were produced for theatrical release in the US during the 1950s just when television started to become popular. The first such movie was Bwana Devil from United Artists that could be seen all across the US in 1952. One year later, in 1953, came the 3D movie House of Wax which also featured stereophonic sound. Alfred Hitchcock produced his film Dial M for Murder in 3D, but for the purpose of maximizing profits the movie was released in 2D because not all cinemas were able to display 3D films. In 1946 the Soviet Union also developed 3D films, with Robinzon Kruzo being its first full-length 3D movie. People were excited to view the 3D movies, but were put off by their poor quality. Because of this, their popularity declined quickly. There was another attempt in the 1970s and 1980s to make 3D movies more mainstream with the releases of Friday the 13th Part III (1982) and Jaws 3-D (1983).

Matsushita Electric (now Panasonic) developed a 3D television that employed an active shutter 3D system in the late 1970s. They unveiled the television in 1981, while at the same time adapting the technology for use with the first stereoscopic video game, Sega's arcade game SubRoc-3D (1982). 3D film showings became more popular throughout the 2000s, culminating in the success of 3D presentations of Avatar in December 2009 and January 2010.

Though 3D movies were generally well received by the public, 3D television did not become popular until after the CES 2010 trade show, when major manufacturers began selling a full lineup of 3D televisions, following the success of Avatar. Shortly thereafter, consumer and professional 3D camcorders were released to the public by Sony and Panasonic. These used two lenses, one for each eye. Around the same time, the LG Optimus 3D, the Fujifilm FinePix Real 3D series, and the Nintendo 3DS were released. According to DisplaySearch, 3D television shipments totaled 41.45 million units in 2012, compared with 24.14 in 2011 and 2.26 in 2010. In late 2013, the number of 3D TV viewers started to decline, and by 2016, development of 3D TV was limited to a few premium models. Production of 3D TVs ended in 2016.

== Technologies ==
There are several techniques to produce and display 3D moving pictures. The following are some of the technical details and methodologies employed in some of the more notable 3D movie systems that have been developed.

The future of 3D television is also emerging as time progresses. New technology like WindowWalls (wall-size displays) and Visible light communication are being implemented into 3D television as the demand for 3D TV increases. Scott Birnbaum, vice president of Samsung's LCD business, said that the demand for 3D TV would skyrocket in the next couple of years, fueled by televised sports (but this did not happen). One might be able to obtain information directly onto their television due to new technologies like the Visible Light Communication that allows for this to happen because the LED lights transmit information by flickering at high frequencies.

=== Displaying technologies ===
Functional principle of active shutter 3D systems

The basic requirement is to display offset images that are filtered separately to the left and right eye. Two strategies have been used to accomplish this: have the viewer wear eyeglasses to filter the separately offset images to each eye, or have the light source split the images directionally into the viewer's eyes (no glasses required). Common 3D display technology for projecting stereoscopic image pairs to the viewer include:

- With filters/lenses:
  - Anaglyph 3D – with passive color filters
  - Polarized 3D system – with passive polarization filters
  - Active shutter 3D system – with active shutters
  - Head-mounted display – with a separate display positioned in front of each eye, and lenses used primarily to relax eye focus
- Without lenses: Autostereoscopic displays, sometimes referred to commercially as Auto 3D.
- Others:

In a CEATEC 2011 exhibition, Hitachi released glasses-free 3D projection systems that use a set of 24 projectors, lenses, and translucent half mirrors to superimpose 3D images with a horizontal viewing angle of 60 degrees and a vertical viewing angle of 30 degrees. Sony is also working on similar technologies.

Single-view displays project only one stereo pair at a time. Multi-view displays either use head tracking to change the view depending on the viewing angle, or simultaneous projection of multiple independent views of a scene for multiple viewers (automultiscopic). Such multiple views can be created on the fly using the 2D-plus-depth format.

Various other display techniques have been described, such as holography, volumetric display, and the Pulfrich effect, which was used in Doctor Who Dimensions in Time, in 1993, by 3rd Rock From The Sun in 1997, and by the Discovery Channel's Shark Week in 2000.

3D glasses may reduce image brightness.

=== Producing technologies ===
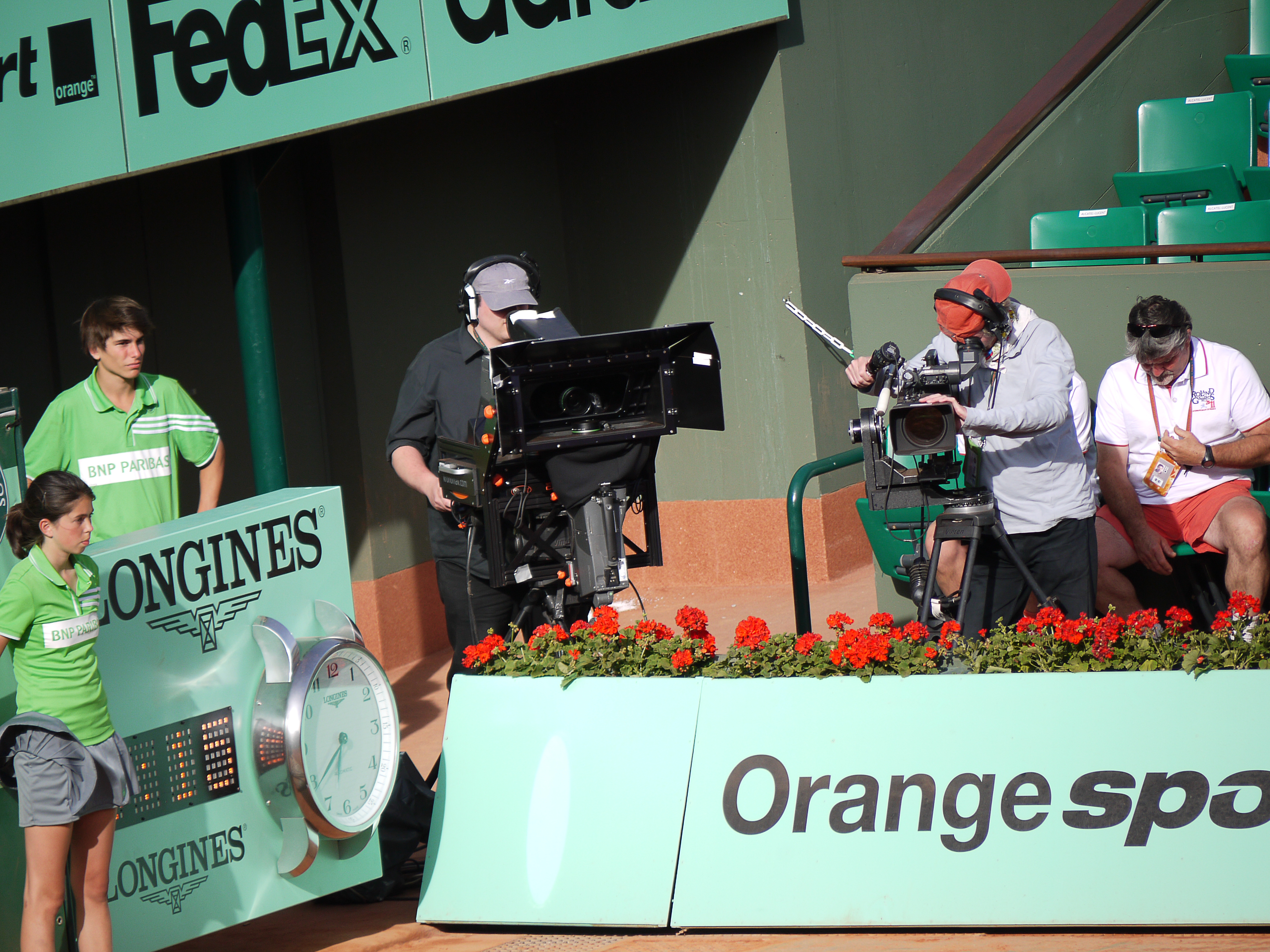
Modern stereo TV camera

Stereoscopy is the most widely accepted method for capturing and delivering 3D video. It involves capturing stereo pairs in a two-view setup, with cameras mounted side by side and separated by the same distance as is between a person's pupils. If we imagine projecting an object point in a scene along the line-of-sight for each eye, in turn; to a flat background screen, we may describe the location of this point mathematically using simple algebra. In rectangular coordinates with the screen lying in the Y–Z plane, with the Z axis upward and the Y axis to the right, with the viewer centered along the X axis; we find that the screen coordinates are simply the sum of two terms. One accounting for perspective and the other for binocular shift. Perspective modifies the Z and Y coordinates of the object point, by a factor of D/(D–x), while binocular shift contributes an additional term (to the Y coordinate only) of s·x/(2·(D–x)), where D is the distance from the selected system origin to the viewer (right between the eyes), s is the eye separation (about 7 centimeters), and x is the true x coordinate of the object point. The binocular shift is positive for the left-eye-view and negative for the right-eye-view. For very distant object points, the eyes will be looking along essentially the same line of sight. For very near objects, the eyes may become excessively "cross-eyed". However, for scenes in the greater portion of the field of view, a realistic image is readily achieved by superposition of the left and right images (using the polarization method or synchronized shutter-lens method) provided the viewer is not too near the screen and the left and right images are correctly positioned on the screen. Digital technology has largely eliminated inaccurate superposition that was a common problem during the era of traditional stereoscopic films.

Multi-view capture uses arrays of many cameras to capture a 3D scene through multiple independent video streams. Plenoptic cameras, which capture the light field of a scene, can also be used to capture multiple views with a single main lens. Depending on the camera setup, the resulting views can either be displayed on multi-view displays, or passed along for further image processing.

After capture, stereo or multi-view image data can be processed to extract 2D plus depth information for each view, effectively creating a device-independent representation of the original 3D scene. These data can be used to aid inter-view image compression or to generate stereoscopic pairs for multiple different view angles and screen sizes.

2D plus depth processing can be used to recreate 3D scenes even from a single view and convert legacy film and video material to a 3D look, though a convincing effect is harder to achieve and the resulting image will likely look like a cardboard miniature.

=== 3D production ===
Production of events such as live sports broadcasts in 3D differs from the methods used for 2D broadcasting. A high technical standard must be maintained because any mismatch in color, alignment, or focus between two cameras may destroy the 3D effect or produce discomfort in the viewer. Zoom lenses for each camera of a stereo pair must track over their full range of focal lengths.

Addition of graphical elements (such as a scoreboard, timers, or logos) to a 3D picture must place the synthesized elements at a suitable depth within the frame, so that viewers can comfortably view the added elements as well as the main picture. This requires more powerful computers to calculate the correct appearance of the graphical elements. For example, the line of scrimmage that appears as a projected yellow line on the field during an American football broadcast requires about one thousand times more processing power to produce in 3D compared to a 2D image.

Since 3D images are effectively more immersive than 2D broadcasts, fewer fast cuts between camera angles are needed. 3D National Football League broadcasts cut between cameras about one-fifth as often as in 2D broadcasting. Rapid cuts between two different viewpoints can be uncomfortable for the viewer, so directors may lengthen the transition or provide images with intermediate depth between two extremes to "rest" the viewer's eyes. 3D images are most effective if the cameras are at a low angle of view, simulating presence of the viewer at the event; this can present problems with people or structures blocking the view of the event. While fewer camera locations are required, the overall number of cameras is similar to a 2D broadcast because each position needs two cameras. Other live sport events have additional factors that affect production; for example, an ice rink presents few cues for depth due to its uniform appearance.

== TV sets ==
These TV sets were high-end and generally included Ethernet, USB player and recorder, Bluetooth and USB Wi-Fi.

=== 3D-ready TV sets ===
3D-ready TV sets are those that can operate in 3D mode (in addition to regular 2D mode) using one of several display technologies to recreate a stereoscopic image. These TV sets usually supported HDMI 1.4 and a minimum output refresh rate of 120 Hz; glasses may be sold separately.

Philips was developing a 3D television set that would be available for the consumer market by about 2011 without the need for special glasses (autostereoscopy). However it was canceled because of the slow adoption of customers going from 2D to 3D.

In August 2010, Toshiba announced plans to bring a range of autostereoscopic TVs to market by the end of the year.

The Chinese manufacturer TCL Corporation developed a 42-inch (110 cm) LCD 3D TV called the TD-42F, which was available in China. This model used a lenticular system and does not require any special glasses (autostereoscopy). When new, it sold for approximately $20,000.

Onida, LG, Samsung, Sony, and Philips intended to increase their 3D TV offering with plans to make 3D TV sales account for over 50% of their respective TV distribution offering in 2012. It was expected that the screens would use a mixture of technologies until there is standardization across the industry. Samsung offers the LED 7000, LCD 750, PDP 7000 TV sets and the Blu-ray 6900.

=== Full 3D TV sets ===
Full 3D TV sets included Samsung Full HD 3D (1920×1080p, 60 Hz) and Panasonic Full HD 3D (1920×1080p, 60 Hz).

A September 2011 Cnet review touted Toshiba's 55ZL2 as "the future of television". Because of the demanding nature of auto-stereoscopic 3D technology, the display features a 3840x2160 display; however, there was at the time no video content available at this resolution. That said, it utilizes a multi-core processor to provide excellent upscaling to the "4k2k" resolution. Using a directional lenticular lenslet filter, the display generates nine 3D views. This technology commonly creates dead spots, which Toshiba avoids by using an eye-tracking camera to adjust the image. The reviewers also note that the 3D resolution for a 1080p signal looks more like 720p and lacks parallax, which reduces immersion.

== Standardization efforts ==
The entertainment industry was expected to adopt a common and compatible standard for 3D in home electronics. To present faster frame rate in high definition to avoid judder (non-smooth, linear motion), enhancing 3D film, televisions and broadcasting, other unresolved standards are the type of 3D glasses (passive or active), including bandwidth considerations, subtitles, recording format, and a Blu-ray standard. With improvements in digital technology, in the late 2000s, 3D movies became more practical to produce and display, putting competitive pressure behind the creation of 3D television standards. There are several techniques for Stereoscopic Video Coding, and stereoscopic distribution formatting including anaglyph, quincunx, and 2D plus Delta. Serial digital interface is used to carry 3D TV signals within TV stations.

Content providers, such as Disney, DreamWorks, and other Hollywood studios, and technology developers, such as Philips, asked SMPTE for the development of a 3DTV standard in order to avoid a battle of formats and to guarantee consumers that they will be able to view the 3D content they purchase and to provide them with 3D home solutions for all pockets. In August 2008, SMPTE established the "3-D Home Display Formats Task Force" to define the parameters of a stereoscopic 3D mastering standard for content viewed on any fixed device in the home, no matter the delivery channel. It explored the standards that need to be set for 3D content distributed via broadcast, cable, satellite, packaged media, and the Internet to be played-out on televisions, computer screens and other tethered displays. After six months, the committee produced a report to define the issues and challenges, minimum standards, and evaluation criteria, which the Society said would serve as a working document for SMPTE 3D standards efforts to follow. A follow-on effort to draft a standard for 3D content formats was expected to take another 18 to 30 months.

Production studios were developing an increasing number of 3D titles for cinema and as many as companies were actively working on the core technology behind the product. Many had technologies available to demonstrate, but no clear road forward for a mainstream offering emerged.

Under these circumstances, SMPTE's inaugural meeting was essentially a call for proposals for 3D television; more than 160 people from 80 companies signed up for this first meeting. Vendors that presented their respective technologies at the task force meeting included SENSIO Technologies, Philips, Dynamic Digital Depth (DDD), TDVision, and RealD 3D, all of which had 3D distribution technologies.

There were many active 3D projects in SMPTE for both TV and filmmakers in the late 2000s. The SMPTE 35PM40 Working Group decided (without influence from the SMPTE Board or any other external influence) that the good progress being made on 3D standards within other SMPTE groups (including the IMF Interoperable Master Format) meant that its "overview" project would be best published as an Engineering Report. However, by 2011, the SMPTE board had "abandoned all further work on 3D television".

However, SMPTE was not the only 3D standards group. Other organizations such as the Consumer Electronics Association (CEA), 3D@Home Consortium, ITU and the Entertainment Technology Center (ETC), at USC School of Cinematic Arts have created their own investigation groups and have already offered to collaborate to reach a common solution. The Digital TV Group (DTG), has committed to profiling a UK standard for 3DTV products and services. Other standard groups such as DVB, BDA, ARIB, ATSC, DVD Forum, IEC and others were involved in the process.

MPEG has been researching multi-view, stereoscopic, and 2D plus depth 3D video coding since the mid-1990s; the first result of this research is the Multiview Video Coding extension for MPEG-4 AVC that is currently undergoing standardization. MVC has been chosen by the Blu-ray disc association for 3D distribution. The format offers backwards compatibility with 2D Blu-ray players.

HDMI version 1.4, released in June 2009, defines a number of 3D transmission formats. The format "Frame Packing" (left and right image packed into one video frame with twice the normal bandwidth) is mandatory for HDMI 1.4 3D devices. All three resolutions (720p50, 720p60, and 1080p24) have to be supported by display devices, and at least one of those by playback devices. Other resolutions and formats are optional. While HDMI 1.4 devices will be capable of transmitting 3D pictures in full 1080p, HDMI 1.3 does not include such support. As an out-of-spec solution for the bitrate problem, a 3D image may be displayed at a lower resolution, like interlaced or at standard definition.

=== DVB 3D-TV standard ===
DVB has established the DVB 3D-TV Specification. The following 3D-TV consumer configurations will be available to the public:

- 3D-TV connected to Blu-ray 3D Player for packaged media.
- 3D-TV connected to HD Games Console, e.g. PS3 for 3D gaming.
- 3D-TV connected to HD STB for broadcast 3D-TV.
- 3D-TV receiving a 3D-TV broadcast directly via a built-in tuner and decoder.

For the two broadcast scenarios above, initial requirements are for Pay-TV broadcasters to deliver 3D-TV services over existing HD broadcasting infrastructures, and to use existing receivers (with firmware upgrade, as required) to deliver 3D content to 3D-TV sets, via an HDMI or equivalent connection, if needed. This is termed Frame Compatible. There are a range of Frame Compatible formats. They include the Side by Side (SbS) format, the Top and Bottom (TaB) format, and others.

== Broadcasts ==
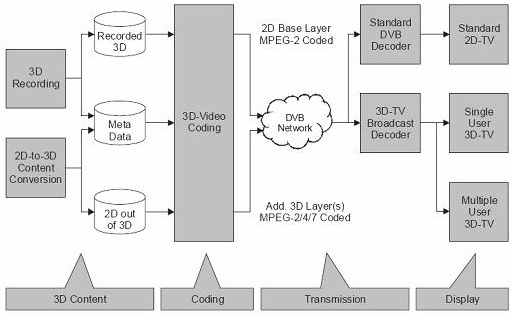
A diagram of the 3D TV scheme

=== 3D channels ===
In 2008, 3D programming was broadcast on Japanese satellite BS11 approximately four times per day.

Cablevision launched a 3D version of its MSG channel on 24 March 2010, which was a limited service that was only available only to Cablevision subscribers on channel 1300. The channel was dedicated primarily to sports broadcasts, including MSG's 3D broadcast of a New York Rangers-New York Islanders game, limited coverage of the 2010 Masters Tournament, and (in cooperation with YES Network) a game between the New York Yankees and Seattle Mariners.

The first Australian program broadcast in high-definition 3D was Fox Sports coverage of the soccer game Australia-New Zealand on 24 May 2010.

Also in Australia, the Nine Network and Special Broadcasting Service brought the State of Origin (matches on 26 May, 16 June and 7 July 2010) (Nine) and FIFA World Cup (SBS) in 3D on Channel 40 respectively.

In early 2010, Discovery Communications, Imax, and Sony announced plans to launch a 3D TV channel in the US with a planned launch in early 2011. At the same time, a Russian company Platform HD and its partners – General Satellite and Samsung Electronics – announced about their 3D television project, which would be the first similar project in Russia.

In Brazil Rede TV! became the first Terrestrial television to transmit 3D signal freely for all 3D enabled audience on 21 May.

Starting on 11 June 2010, ESPN launched a new channel, ESPN 3D, dedicated to 3D sports with up to 85 live events a year in 3D.

On 1 January 2010, the world's first 3D channel, SKY 3D, started broadcasting nationwide in South Korea by Korea Digital Satellite Broadcasting. The channel's slogan is "World No.1 3D Channel". This 24/7 channel uses the Side by Side technology at a resolution of 1920x1080i. 3D contents include education, animation, sport, documentary and performances.

A full 24-hour broadcast channel was announced at the 2010 Consumer Electronics show as a joint venture from IMAX, Sony, and the Discovery channel. The intent was to launch the channel in the United States by year end 2010. However, this did not materialize in time.

DirecTV and Panasonic launched 2 broadcast channels and 1 Video on demand channel with 3D content in June 2010. DirecTV previewed a live demo of their 3D feed at the Consumer Electronics Show held 7–10 January 2010.

In Europe, British Sky Broadcasting (Sky) launched a limited 3D TV broadcast service on 3 April 2010. Transmitting from the Astra 2A satellite at 28.2° east, Sky 3D broadcast a selection of live English Premier League football matches to over 1000 British pubs and clubs equipped with a Sky+HD Digibox and 3D Ready TVs, and preview programmes provided for free to top-tier Sky HD subscribers with 3D TV equipment. This was later expanded to include a selection of films, sports, and entertainment programming launched to Sky subscribers on 1 October 2010.

On 28 September 2010, Virgin Media launched a 3D TV on Demand service.

Several other European pay-TV networks are also planning 3D TV channels and some have started test transmissions on other Astra satellites, including French pay-TV operator Canal+ which has announced its first 3D channel is to be launched in December 2010. Also the Spanish Canal+ has started the first broadcastings on 18 May 2010 and included 2010 FIFA World Cup matches in the new Canal+ 3D channel. Satellite operator SES started a free-to-air 3D demonstration channel on the Astra satellite at 23.5° east on 4 May 2010 for the opening of the 2010 ANGA Cable international trade fair using 3D programming supplied by 3D Ready TV manufacturer Samsung under an agreement between Astra and Samsung to co-promote 3D TV.

By November 2010, there were eight 3D channels broadcasting to Europe from three Astra satellite positions, including demonstrations provided by Astra, pay-TV from BSkyB, Canal+ and others, and the Dutch Brava3D cultural channel, which provides a mix of classical music, opera and ballet free-to-air across Europe from Astra 23.5°E.

In April 2011, HIGH TV (a 3D family entertainment channel) launched. Headquartered in NY with offices in Hong Kong and London, the channel broadcasts through eight satellites round the world, covering Europe, Asia, the Nordic region, Russia, South America, Africa, Middle East and North America.

3flow is a 3D channel that began broadcasting on Freebox in France on 1 April 2011. Made up entirely of native stereoscopic programming produced and owned by WildEarth and Sasashani (WildEarth's parent company). Initially the focus was mostly safari and has now widened to include underwater, extreme sports and other 3D content from around the world. WildEarth and Sasashani also distribute 3D series and shows through 3D Content Hub.

On 1 January 2012, China's first 3D Test Channel launched on China Central Television and 5 other networks.

On 1 February 2012: The Extreme Sports Channel – the home of Extreme Sports launched in Italy on Sky Italia marking its international début in high definition (HD).

The channel's HD feed will be a simulcast of the standard definition feed launched in 1999, which now broadcasts to subscribers in 66 territories and in 12 languages across Europe, the Middle East and Africa (EMEA). The inaugural launch on Italy's Sky platform sees the channel's entrance into the HD market and from there it will begin rolling out to operators across the EMEA region.

In February 2012 Telecable de Tricom, a major Dominican cable TV provider, announced the launch of the first 3D TV programming package in Latin America. As of 3 July 2012, the only 3D channels available are 3flow and HIGH TV 3D.

In July 2013 the BBC announced that it would be indefinitely suspending 3D programming due to a lack of uptake. Only half of the estimated 1.5 million households in the UK with a 3D-enabled television watched the 2012 summer's Olympics opening ceremony in 3D.

In 2013, in the US, ESPN 3D was shut down due to lack of demand, followed by Xfinity 3D and all DirecTV 3D programming in 2014.

=== List of 3D TV channels ===
Channel	Country(s)	Note(s)	Status
3flow	Worldwide	Wildlife and entertainment	Active
HIGH TV 3D	Worldwide	Entertainment	Active
Penthouse 3D HD	United States	Porn	
n3D	United States	DirecTV only	Defunct
Cinema 3D	United States	DirecTV only	Defunct
3net	United States	DirecTV only	Defunct
MSG 3D	United States	Cablevision only	Defunct
ESPN 3D	United States	Sport	Defunct
Xfinity 3D	United States	Comcast only	Defunct
Sky 3D	United Kingdom and Ireland	Sky only	Defunct
Foxtel 3D	Australia	Foxtel only	Defunct
HD1	Belgium (and other European countries)	Free-to-air	
Sky 3D	Germany and Austria	Sky Deutschland only	Defunct
Anixe 3D	German-speaking countries	Free-to-air	Defunct
Nova 3D	Greece	Entertainment	
Sport 5 3D	Israel	Sport	Defunct
Sky 3D	Italy	Sky Italia only	
Brava3D	Europe	Free-to-air	Defunct
Hustler HD 3D	Italy	Porn	
Canal+ 3D	France	Canal+ only	Defunct
LaTV3D	France	LaTV3D OTT	Active
Canal+ 3D España	Spain	Canal+ only	Active
CANAL+ 3D	Poland	CYFRA+ only	
NEXT Man 3D	Poland		
NEXT Lejdis 3D	Poland		
NEXT Young 3D	Poland		
nShow 3D	Poland	ITI Group only	Defunct
NTV Plus 3D	Russia	made by Panasonic for broadcast on NTV Plus services only	Defunct
Viasat 3D	Sweden	Viasat only	Defunct
Teledünya 3D	Turkey	Teledünya only	
Digitürk 3D	Turkey	Digitürk only	
Smart 3D	Turkey	Presentations	
Sky 3D	South Korea	SkyLife only	
SBS 3D	South Korea	Free-to-air	
TV Azteca 3D	Mexico	Free-to-air	
Sukachan 3D169	Japan	Sky PerfecTV! only	Defunct
BS11	Japan		
RedeTV! 3D	Brazil	First free-to-air 3D channel in Brazil	Defunct
Active 3D	India	Videocon d2h only	
MOBILESTAR 3D TV	India	First HD 3D channel in India	
Zhongguo 3D dianshi shiyan pindao	China	Made up by 6 different TV companies	

Standard HD channels have also broadcast in 3D. BBC HD occasionally broadcast high-profile events in 3D including the Wimbledon men's & ladies' singles finals and the opening and closing ceremonies of the 2012 Summer Olympics. However the BBC abandoned 3D broadcasting following the 2013 Wimbledon tennis championships.

=== 3D episodes and shows ===
There have been several notable examples in television where 3D episodes have been produced, typically as one-hour specials or special events.

==== 1980s ====
The first-ever 3D broadcast in the UK was an episode of the weekly science magazine The Real World, made by Television South and screened in the UK in February 1982. The program included excerpts of test footage shot by Philips in the Netherlands. Red/green 3D glasses were given away free with copies of the TV Times listings magazine, but the 3D sections of the program were shown in monochrome. The experiment was repeated nationally in December 1982, with red/blue glasses allowing color 3D to be shown for the first time. The program was repeated the following weekend followed by a rare screening of the Western Fort Ti starring George Montgomery and Joan Vohs.

In 1985 Portugal's national TV channel RTP 1 broadcast the movie Creature from the Black Lagoon in anaglyph format. Red/cyan 3D glasses were sold with magazines.

==== 1990s ====
In November 1993, the BBC announced a one-off week of 3D programming filmed using the pioneering Pulfrich 3D technique. 3D glasses were sold in shops around the UK, a percentage of the sales going to the Children In Need charity. The week's programming concluded with a screening of the 3D Doctor Who special "Dimensions In Time" as well as specially shot segments of Noel's House Party and the annual Children In Need charity appeal.

3D television episodes were a brief fad on U.S. television during the May 1997 sweeps. The sitcom 3rd Rock from the Sun showed a two-part episode, "Nightmare On Dick Street", where several of the characters' dreams are shown in 3D. The episode cued its viewers to put on their 3D glasses (which used the Pulfrich effect) by including "3D on" and "3D off" icons in the corner of the screen as a way to alert them as to when the 3D sequences would start and finish. Customers were given free glasses courtesy of a joint venture between Little Caesars pizza and Barq's Root Beer. Also in May 1997, ABC had a special line-up of shows that showcased specific scenes in 3D. The shows included Home Improvement, Spin City, The Drew Carey Show, Ellen, Family Matters, Step by Step, Sabrina, The Teenage Witch, and America's Funniest Home Videos. Similar to 3rd Rock, an icon alerted viewers when to put on the 3D glasses. Customers were given free anaglyph glasses at Wendy's for the promotion. Nickelodeon had a special lineup of shows in 1997 that also showcased specific scenes in 3D promoted as Nogglevision; ChromaDepth was the technology of choice for Nickelodeon's 3D.

==== 2000s ====
Television shows including the drama Medium and the comedy Chuck (Season 2, episode 12) used 3D television.

Channel 4 in the UK ran a short season of 3D programming in November 2009 including Derren Brown and The Queen in 3D. Unlike previous British 3D TV experiments, the program were transmitted in ColorCode 3D.

In May 2006 Portugal's national TV channel RTP 1 broadcast several shows in anaglyph format ("Real 3D") for a week. Red/cyan 3D glasses were sold exclusively by a hypermarket chain.

==== 2010s ====
On 31 January 2010, BSKYB became the first broadcaster in the world to show a live sports event in 3D when Sky Sports screened a football match between Manchester United and Arsenal to a public audience in several selected pubs.

On 31 January 2010, the 52nd Grammy Awards featured a Michael Jackson Tribute Sequence in 3D, using anaglyph format.

The very first stereoscopic indie live action comedy one-hour show called Safety Geeks : SVI : 3D specifically for 3DTV and 3D VOD was produced and released in March 2010 through Digital Dynamic Depth / Yabazam and their Yabazam website portal. Safety Geeks:SVI is the comic adventures of an elite force of safety experts, the P.O.S.H. (Professional Occupational Safety Hazard) team. Obsessed with making the world safer, the CSI-like team investigates accidents to find out what went wrong and who is to blame. It won the Los Angeles 3D film Festival in 2010 as best pilot or series in 3D.

In April 2010, the Masters Tournament was broadcast in live 3D on DirecTV, Comcast, and Cox.

The Roland Garros tennis tournament in Paris, from 23 May to 6 June 2010, was filmed in 3D (center court only) and broadcast live via ADSL and fiber to Orange subscribers throughout France in a dedicated Orange TV channel.

Fox Sports broadcasts the first program in 3D in Australia when the Socceroos played The New Zealand All Whites at the MCG on 24 May 2010.

The Nine Network broadcast the first Free-to-air 3D telecast when the Queensland Maroons faced the New South Wales Blues at ANZ Stadium on 26 May 2010.

On 29 May 2010, Sky broadcasts Guinness Premiership Final in 3D in selected pubs and clubs.

25 matches in the FIFA World Cup 2010 were broadcast in 3D.

The Inauguration of Philippine President Noynoy Aquino on 30 June 2010 was the first presidential inauguration to telecast in live 3D by GMA Network. However, the telecast was only broadcast in a small number of localities.

The 2010 Coke Zero 400 was broadcast in 3D on 3 July on NASCAR.com and DirecTV along with Comcast, TWC, and Bright House cable systems.

Astro broadcast the 2010 FIFA World Cup Final on 11 July 2010 in 3-D on their B.yond service.

Satellite delivered Bell TV in Canada began to offer a full-time pay-TV, 3D channel to its subscribers on 27 July 2010.

The 2010 PGA Championship was broadcast in 3D for four hours on 13 August 2010, from 3–7 pm EDT. The broadcast was available on DirecTV, Comcast, Time Warner Cable, Bright House Networks, Cox Communications, and Cablevision.

In September 2010, the Canadian Broadcasting Corporation's first 3D broadcast was a special about the Canadian monarch, Elizabeth II, and included 3-D film footage of the Queen's 1953 coronation as well as 3D video of her 2010 tour of Canada. This marks the first time the historical 3D images have been seen anywhere on television as well as the first broadcast of a Canadian-produced 3D program in Canada.

Verizon FioS and the NFL partnered to broadcast 2 September 2010, pre-season game between the New England Patriots and the New York Giants in 3D. The game was only broadcast in 3D in the northeast.

The 2010 AFL Grand Final, on 25 September 2010, was broadcast in 3D from the Seven Network.

Rachael Ray aired a 3D Halloween Bash on 29 October 2010.

The first Japanese television series in 3D, Tokyo Control, premiered on 19 January 2011.

In May 2011, 3net released the first docu-reality TV series entitled Bullproof filmed in native 3D made by Digital Revolution Studios.

The 2011 3D Creative Arts Awards "Your World in 3D" was the first award show filmed in native 3D and televised on 3net 3D channel broadcast on DirectTV. The production was filmed at the Grauman's Chinese Theatre in Hollywood.

On 16 July 2011, The Parlotones (South African Rock Act) became the first band to broadcast a Live Rock Opera to Terrestrial Cinema in 3D, a Live 3D feed to DIRECT TV in the US and Facebook pay per view. It was called "Dragonflies & Astronauts".

The semi-finals, Bronze Final and Final matches of the 2011 Rugby World Cup will be broadcast in 3D.

Singapore based Tiny Island Productions is currently producing Dream Defenders, which will be available in both autostereoscopic and stereoscopic 3D formats. 3net, which acquired the series, describes it as the first stereoscopic children's series and will air on 25 September 2011.

In July 2011, the BBC announced that the grand final of Strictly Come Dancing in December 2011 will air in 3-D.

The BBC broadcast the 2011 finals of the Wimbledon Lawn Tennis Championships in 3D.

In February 2012 Telecable de Tricom, a major Dominican cable TV provider, announced the launch of the first 3D TV programming package in Latin America. As of 10 August 2012 the only 3D channels available are Wildearth, 3 Flow 3D, and High TV 3D.

Avi Arad is currently developing a 3D Pac-Man TV show.

The Xbox Live broadcasts of the 2012 Miss Universe and Miss USA beauty pageants were available in RealD 3D.

In 2013, in Brazil, NET HD pay-per-view broadcasts of the thirteenth season of Big Brother Brasil were available in 3D.

In July 2013, the BBC announced that they were putting 3D broadcasts on hold due to lack of audience interest, even from those who owned 3D TV displays.

As one of their final 3D broadcasts, 23 November 2013, the BBC aired a special 3D episode of Doctor Who in celebration of that show's fiftieth anniversary. That episode, The Day of the Doctor, was filmed and produced in 3D, and broadcast in 2D and 3D in the UK, with simultaneous showings in 3D in cinemas around the world. It has since been made available on 3D Blu-ray.

== Decline ==
As early as 2013, 3D televisions were being seen as a fad. DirecTV had stopped broadcasting 3D programs in 2012, while ESPN stopped in 2013. In the UK, Sky moved its content to on-demand, and the BBC ended airing 3D shows in 2013 due to "lack of public appetite".

Fewer and fewer 3D TVs were sold and soon TV manufacturers stopped making them. Vizio stopped production in 2014 and was followed by others. In January 2017, the last two major television manufacturers still producing 3D televisions, Sony and LG, announced they would stop all 3D support.

== World record ==
The 2011 UEFA Champions League Final match between Manchester United and Barcelona was broadcast live in 3D format on a Ukrainian-produced EKTA screen in Gothenburg, Sweden. The screen made it to The Guinness Book of World Records as the world's biggest screen. The live 3D broadcast was provided by the company Viasat.

== Health effects ==
Some viewers have complained of headaches, seizures and eyestrain after watching Active Shutter 3DTV. There have been several warnings, especially for the elderly. Motion sickness, in addition to other health concerns, is more easily induced by 3D presentations.

There are primarily two effects of 3D TV that are unnatural for the human vision: crosstalk between the eyes caused by imperfect image separation and the mismatch between convergence and accommodation caused by the difference between an object's perceived position in front of or behind the screen and the real origin of that light on the screen.

It is believed that approximately 12% of people are unable to properly see 3D images, owing to a variety of medical conditions. According to another experiment, up to 30% of people have very weak stereoscopic vision preventing depth perception based on stereo disparity. This nullifies or greatly decreases immersion effects of digital stereo to them.

== See also ==
- Autostereoscopy
- Stereoscopy
- 2D-plus-Depth
- 2D plus Delta
- 3D display
- 3D film
  - List of 3D films
- Blu-ray 3D Disc
- Crosstalk
- Digital 3D
- HD TV
- LED TV
- Nintendo 3DS
- SES
