= EKTA =

- Industry: Display technology
- Founded: 1992
- Headquarters: Kyiv, Ukraine
- Products: LED displays, image processing equipment and software

ЕКТА is a group of companies, a Ukrainian developer and manufacturer of LED video screens based on LED technology. EKTA was founded on January 19, 1992, by a group of engineers with experience in business video equipment development. The central office of the managing company is located in Kyiv, and the LED-screen production plant is located in Zhytomyr (Ukraine).

EKTA has done screen installations in Japan, Germany, Italy, England, Austria, Canada, Kuwait, UAE, South Korea, Russia, Estonia, Latvia. EKTA Led screens are installed in the session hall of the Ukrainian Parliament, Kyiv Palace of Sports and on the giant clock-tower at the Central Independence Square in the Ukrainian capital.

== History of the name ==
The name EKTA is composed of the first parts of words "screens" (экраны) and "board" (табло). Initially, the company's name was written in Russian as “ЭКТА” and in the company logo the Ukrainian version “EKTA” was used. However, in 2003, the logo was changed and the official name EKTA was approved. Thus only Latin symbols are left in the name of the company.

== Company’s history ==
The company was founded in 1992.

In 1995 EKTA became a leading Ukrainian manufacturer of large plasma screens and displays. In 1995 EKTA started in the rental business, providing plasma video-walls of its own production for concert staging.

In 1996 Italian rental companies started to use EKTA plasma video-panels.

Since 1999 EKTA has been a provider of visual display equipment in specialized niches and applications throughout the CIS (including voting systems).

In 2000 the Media Garden EXPO 2000 project was completed in Hannover for the national Germany pavilion. In the same year EKTA developed the first model of large LED screens.

In 2004 EKTA production introduced the ideology of Total quality management (TQM).

In 2005 EKTA began building a new plant for LED screen production.

In 2007-2008 new LED products were introduced into development: strips that allow building semi-transparent video-screens, and also screens for indoor usage with enhanced contrast.

In 2008 EKTA opened its representative office in the United Arab Emirates - EKTA Middle East.

In 2009, the company joined the International Association of Audiovisual Systems Integrators InfoComm International. Today EKTA is the only Ukrainian member of this international association.

In 2009-2011 a range of products were launched onto the market. Those are LED video-floor for show-business, LED road signs and boards for the road sector, and LEDs for digital signage.

In 2010 EKTA launched large LED screens operating in 3D format, and in 2011 realization of commercial projects using 3D technology was started.

In 2011 the biggest LED 3D TV produced by EKTA has made the Guinness World Record. The screen was introduced on May 28, 2011, in Gothenburg (Sweden).

== EKTA holding structure ==
=== ЕКТА managing company ===
The central office of the EKTA managing company is located in Kyiv (Ukraine).

=== Led-screens production plant EKTA-PROM ===
All products under the EKTA brand name are produced at the company's plant that is located in Zhytomyr (Ukraine), 130 km (81 mi) from Kyiv.

=== EKTARENT company ===
EKTArent company provides video screen equipment for events. EKTA specialists carry out technical support of the events (selection of appropriate screen models, creating and processing content, delivery, installation, setup and dismantling of equipment and footage broadcast).

=== OptiVision company ===
OptiVision company is an audio- and visual integrator. It performs signage video networks construction, broadcast channels creation and formatting, installation of LED displays and other elements of digital signage.

=== VideoTime advertising agency ===
VideoTime is a structural unit of EKTA, the holding which is engaged in manufacturing and placing video-advertising materials on large LED screens throughout Ukraine, as well as internal signage networks in retail and entertainment centers.

== Partners ==
=== EKTA Vision Gmbh ===
EKTA's partner in Germany and Western Europe.

=== The group of companies «Плазменные технологии» ===
EKTA's partner in Russia.

=== EVENTECH ===
EKTA's partner in Baltic and Scandinavian countries.
