= Dead arm syndrome =

Dead arm syndrome is a term used in sports medicine to describe shoulder pain or discomfort with the loss of normal throwing ability. Athletes may experience reduced throwing speed and control due to these symptoms. Dead arm syndrome has been linked to shoulder instability, labral injuries, and alterations in shoulder mechanics.

== History and evolving understanding ==
Early research by Rowe and Zarins in 1981 described a possible explanation of dead arm syndrome: repeated episodes of shoulder subluxation. Then in 2000, Burkhart and colleagues proposed that tightness in the back of the shoulder, limited internal rotation, and superior labral anterior posterior (SLAP) lesions may play a role in dead arm syndrome.

Later research by Burkhart and colleagues in 2003 discussed dead arm symptoms within the broader concept of the disabled throwing shoulder. The concept considers both shoulder injuries and problems with throwing mechanics. More recent research by Kibler and colleagues in 2022 updated this approach by discussing how labral injuries, changes in shoulder movement, and kinetic chain dysfunction may affect throwing ability. They also emphasized that shoulder problems should be evaluated by considering the entire kinetic chain rather than focusing on one single injury.

== Signs and symptoms ==
Dead arm symptoms usually occur during overhead throwing. Some patients may have sudden and sharp shoulder pain during the late cocking phase. The pain may occur at the front or back of the shoulder. Some patients may also experience pain or popping when the shoulder is abducted and externally rotated. They may feel their arms are "dead" and difficult to throw with. Other patients may notice a gradual decline in throwing velocity or control, sometimes with posterior shoulder pain.

Athletes with acute posterosuperior SLAP lesions may have mild posterior shoulder pain or tightness before the injury. Some of them may also experience activity-related bicipital groove pain. Patients with clinically significant labral injuries may also experience additional symptoms, including weakness, clicking, catching, or locking.

== Causes and pathophysiology ==
One proposed explanation for dead arm syndrome involves repetitive motion and forces on the posterior capsule of the shoulder during overhead throwing. The posterior capsule is a band of fibrous tissue that interconnects with tendons of the rotator cuff of the shoulder. Four muscles and their tendons make up the rotator cuff. They cover the outside of the shoulder to hold, protect and move the joint.

Repetitive overhead throwing may contribute to tightness of the posterior capsule called posterior capsular contracture. This type of problem reduces the amount the shoulder can rotate inwardly, contributing to a glenohumeral internal rotation deficit (GIRD). However, some loss of internal rotation is a normal adaptation in overhead throwing athletes and does not necessarily indicate an injury. GIRD is more concerning when the reduction in the total range of shoulder rotation happens.

Over time, with enough force, a tear may develop in the labrum. The labrum is a rim of cartilage around the shoulder socket that helps hold the head of the humerus (upper arm) in the joint. A tear involving the superior labrum from anterior to posterior is called a superior labrum anterior posterior (SLAP) lesion.

== Treatment ==
Treatment depends on the shoulder injury or dysfunction. Physical therapy with stretching and strengthening exercises may help improve shoulder movement and function. For overhead athletes with SLAP lesions, nonoperative treatment is generally recommended before considering surgery. Surgery may be considered if pain and functional limitations persist after nonoperative treatment.
