= ESPN 3D =

Defunct 3D TV channel

- Country: United States; Australia; Brazil
- Broadcast area: Nationwide
- Headquarters: Bristol, Connecticut

Programming
- Language(s): English
- Picture format: 720p (3DTV/HDTV)

Ownership
- Owner: ESPN Inc. (The Walt Disney Company, 80%; Hearst Corporation, 20%)

History
- Launched: June 11, 2010 (United States); July 30, 2010 (Australia)
- Closed: September 30, 2013

ESPN 3D was an American digital cable and satellite television channel that was owned by ESPN Inc., a joint venture between The Walt Disney Company (which operated the network, through its 80% controlling ownership interest) and the Hearst Corporation (which holds the remaining 20% interest). The channel featured 3D telecasts of sports events that ESPN held broadcast rights, and simulcasted live games from other ESPN networks on a semi-regular basis.

== History ==
ESPN 3D launched on June 11, 2010 with a 3D broadcast of the opening match of the 2010 FIFA World Cup between South Africa and Mexico. Other programs broadcast on the channel in its first year included the 2011 BCS National Championship Game and various college football and basketball games. Early programming included 25 matches from the 2010 World Cup and the Summer X Games. Up to 85 live events were shown on the network in 2010. ESPN 3D produced 14 games from the National Basketball Association (NBA) during the 2010-11 season, including seven playoff games. The first NBA game broadcast on ESPN 3D was a December 17, 2010 match between the Miami Heat and the New York Knicks. On June 30, 2011, ESPN announced that ESPN 3D would air the first men's semi-finals match of the 2011 Wimbledon Championships live, to be followed by a tape delayed broadcast of the second men's semi-finals. On July 4, 2011, it would also air a recorded broadcast of the ladies' and men's finals. ESPN 3D also broadcast all of the games of the 2011 Little League World Series.

Originally operating as a part-time service, ESPN 3D began broadcasting 24 hours a day on February 14, 2011. ESPN 3D was shut down on September 30, 2013, citing "limited viewer adoption of 3D services".

== Carriage ==
DirecTV, Comcast and AT&T U-verse carried ESPN 3D at its launch. Time Warner Cable reached an agreement to carry the channel a few months later and Verizon FiOS began carrying it in April 2011.

On August 1, 2011, during that year's X Games, AT&T U-verse abruptly stopped carrying ESPN 3D to its customers, citing high cost and low demand.
