= List of stereoscopic video games =

This is a list of stereoscopic video games. The following article is the list of notable stereoscopic 3D games and related productions and the platforms they can run on. Additionally, many PC games are supported or are unsupported but capable 3D graphics with AMD HD3D, DDD TriDef, Nvidia 3D Vision, 3DGM, and more.

Title	Platforms	First release date	Description
SubRoc-3D	Arcade	1982	Uses a special eyepiece, a viewer with spinning discs to alternate left and right images to the player's eye from a single monitor. The game's active shutter 3D system jointly developed by Sega with Matsushita (now Panasonic).
Vectrex 3D Imager peripheral	Vectrex	1984	A proprietary disk-rotating glasses system
Battle Bird	Arcade	1986	Developed by Irem and released in January 1986. It used Irem's 3D Vision system, which displayed stereoscopic 3D color graphics using a complex 3D system consisting of a dual-monitor setup, a half-silvered mirror, and a viewer with a polarizing filter for each eye.
3-D Thunder Ceptor II	Arcade	1986	Developed by Namco, the stereoscopic 3D image is generated using LCD shutter glasses, which is enhanced by a Fresnel lens placed between the video screen and shutter glasses, giving the impression of large 3D images coming near the player. It was one of several stereoscopic 3D arcade video games at the time, along with titles from rival companies Irem, Sega and Taito.
Hover Force	Intellivision	1986	Programmed with ChromaDepth 3D technology and shown publicly by Mattel Electronics as Hover Force 3-D at 1984 January CES. Released in 1987 by INTV Corporation; 3D glasses not included.
The various SegaScope 3D games	Master System	1987–1989	A proprietary LCD Shutter Glasses system, not compatible with Modern 3D TV systems.
Continental Circus	Arcade	1987	Active shutter 3D glasses
Maze Hunter 3-D	Master System	1987	LCD Shutter Glasses (SegaScope 3D)
Missile Defense 3-D	Master System	1987	LCD Shutter Glasses (SegaScope 3D)
Zaxxon 3-D	Master System	1987	LCD Shutter Glasses (SegaScope 3D)
3-D WorldRunner	NES, FDS	1987	Anaglyph mode
Rad Racer (Highway Star in Japan)	NES	1987	LCD Shutter Glasses (Famicom 3D System), Anaglyph mode (USA)
JJ	Famicom	1987	LCD Shutter Glasses (Famicom 3D System)
Falsion	Famicom Disk System	1987	LCD Shutter Glasses (Famicom 3D System)
Attack Animal Gakuen	Famicom	1987	LCD Shutter Glasses (Famicom 3D System)
Blade Eagle 3-D	Master System	1988	LCD Shutter Glasses (SegaScope 3D)
Space Harrier 3-D	Master System	1988	LCD Shutter Glasses (SegaScope 3D)
Famicom Grand Prix II: 3D Hot Rally	Famicom Disk System	1988	LCD Shutter Glasses (Famicom 3D System)
Wanderer 3D	Amiga, Atari ST, Sinclair QL	1988	Anaglyph mode
SpaceSpuds	Amiga	1988	Anaglyph mode
Poseidon Wars 3-D	Master System	1989	LCD Shutter Glasses (SegaScope 3D)
Cosmic Epsilon	Famicom	1989	LCD Shutter Glasses (Famicom 3D System)
Beyond the Black Hole	MS-DOS, Commodore 64, Commodore 128	1989	
The various Sega VR games	Arcade, Mega Drive, Saturn	1991-1995	Head-mounted display
The various Virtuality games	Arcade	1991-1996	Head-mounted display
Orb-3D	NES	1991	Pulfrich effect
Doom	PC	1993	Unofficial support via the GZDoom engine (OpenGL renderer only): Anaglyph mode (Red/Cyan, Green/Magenta, Amber/Blue), side-by-side, top-bottom, interleaved, checkerboard
Doom II	PC	1994	Unofficial support via the GZDoom engine (OpenGL renderer only): Anaglyph mode (Red/Cyan, Green/Magenta, Amber/Blue), side-by-side, top-bottom, interleaved, checkerboard
Heretic	PC	1994	Unofficial support via the GZDoom engine (OpenGL renderer only): Anaglyph mode (Red/Cyan, Green/Magenta, Amber/Blue), side-by-side, top-bottom, interleaved, checkerboard
Magic Carpet	MS-DOS	1994	Anaglyph mode, autostereogram mode, Forte VFX1
Nintendo Virtual Boy	Nintendo Virtual Boy	1995	The first home game system designed around 3D, which was produced from dual images inside a viewer that displayed red monochrome images.
Descent	MS-DOS	1995	Anaglyph mode, head-mounted display (support for VFX-1 head-mounted Display and CyberMaxx HMD)
Contra: Legacy of War	PlayStation	1996	Anaglyph mode
Duke Nukem 3D	MS-DOS	1996	Anaglyph mode, limited support for LCD shutter glasses (only the CrystalEyes VR model from Stereographics is supported).
Quake	PC	1996	Anaglyph mode supported by the Quakespasm source port (set r_stereo 1).
FlightGear	PC	1997	Anaglyph mode, quad buffered, horizontal split, vertical split, VR mode
Hexen: Beyond Heretic	PC	1997	Unofficial support via the GZDoom engine (OpenGL renderer only): Anaglyph mode (Red/Cyan, Green/Magenta, Amber/Blue), side-by-side, top-bottom, interleaved, checkerboard
Heart of Darkness	PlayStation, Windows	1998	Anaglyph used for a few cut-scenes in the game; main gameplay is normal 2D
Serious Sam	Windows	2001	Anaglyph
The Elder Scrolls III: Morrowind	PC	2002	Unofficial side-by-side 3D when using the OpenMW engine and setting some environment variables.
Downtown Run	PlayStation 2, Windows, GameCube	2003	Anaglyph mode
Nanosaur 2: Hatchling	Mac (3D), Windows	2004	Anaglyph mode
Trigger Rally	PC	2004	Anaglyph mode, Quad buffer
OpenArena	PC	2005	Anaglyph mode via ioquake3 engine (set r_anaglyphMode 1).
Sly 3: Honor Among Thieves	PlayStation 2 (3D)	2005	Anaglyph mode (certain sections only)
TrackMania Nations/United Forever	Windows	2006	Anaglyph mode, game update adds modes for line-interleaved stereoscopic displays and a side-by-side AVI video recording mode
CubiCute - The 3D Game	Online mini game (3D)	2008	Anaglyph
Skate 2	Xbox 360	2009	Anaglyph
Shaun White Skateboarding	PS3, Xbox 360	2010	Side-by-side mode which most 3D TVs can project as 3D
Minecraft	Java platform, Java applet	2009	Anaglyph mode (Only available pre-version 1.13)
Diorama	iPhone, iOS	2009	Anaglyph mode
G-Force	Xbox 360	2009	Anaglyph mode
Invincible Tiger: The Legend of Han Tao	Xbox 360	2009	Anaglyph mode, some manual modes compatible with 3D via HDMI standard and several types of 3D PC monitors
Cloudy with a Chance of Meatballs	Windows, Xbox 360, Wii, Nintendo DS, PlayStation Portable	2009	Anaglyph mode, adventure game
Toy Story Mania!	Wii	2009	Anaglyph mode
James Cameron's Avatar: The Game	Windows, PS3, Xbox 360	2009	Windows : Nvidia 3D Vision, Dual-projectors, iZ3D Monitor, some manual modes compatible with 3D via HDMI standard PS3 and Xbox 360 : Some manual modes compatible with 3D via HDMI standard and several types of 3D PC monitors.
Trine	Windows, MacOS, Linux	2009	Windows : Nvidia 3D Vision, iZ3D drivers
MotorStorm: 3D Rift	PS3	2010	3D via HDMI standard
Luanti (Formally Minetest)	PC	2010	Anaglyph, side-by-side, interlaced, top-bottom
Top Spin 4	PS3, Xbox 360	2010	3D via HDMI standard
Pro Evolution Soccer 2013	PS3	2012	3D via HDMI standard, 3D not in Xbox 360 Version
Virtua Tennis 4	PS3	2012	3D via HDMI standard, 3D not in Xbox 360 Version
Wipeout HD	PS3	2010	3D via HDMI standard, No 3D in Wipeout HD fury!
Super Stardust HD	PS3	2010	3D via HDMI standard
The Adventures of Tintin: The Secret of the Unicorn	PS3	2011	3D via HDMI standard
Mayhem	Xbox 360	2011	
NBA 2K12	Xbox 360	2011	Anaglyph mode (Red/Cyan, Green/Magenta), Side-by-side
Pain	PS3	2010	3D via HDMI standard
Call of Duty: Black Ops	PS3, Windows, Xbox 360	2010	Windows : Nvidia 3D Vision; PS3 and Xbox 360 : 3D via HDMI standard
Call of Duty: Black Ops II	Xbox 360	2012	Anaglyph mode (Red/Cyan)
The Sly Collection	PS3	2010	3D via HDMI standard
Prince of Persia Trilogy	PS3	2010	3D via HDMI standard
Gran Turismo 5	PS3	2010	3D via HDMI standard
Attack of the Movies 3D	Wii, Xbox 360	2010	Anaglyph mode
Batman Arkham Asylum: Game of the Year: 3D Edition	PS3, Xbox 360	2010	TriOviz INFICOLOR 3D glasses for 2D HDTV. 3D delivered by TriOviz for Games Technology., NVIDIA 3DVision
Enslaved: Odyssey to the West; DLC Pigsy's Perfect 10	PS3, Xbox 360	2010	3D via HDMI standard for 3D HDTV, TriOviz INFICOLOR 3D glasses for 2D HDTV. 3D delivered by TriOviz for Games Technology.
The various Nintendo 3DS games	Nintendo 3DS	2011-20,2022	Parallax barrier autostereoscopic display
Hedgewars	Windows, Linux, OS X	Since 2011	Side-by-side Anaglyph mode Wiggle
Dynasty Warriors 7	PS3, Xbox 360	2011	3D via HDMI standard
Thor: God of Thunder	PS3, Xbox 360	2011	3D via HDMI standard for 3D HDTV, TriOviz INFICOLOR 3D glasses for 2D HDTV. 3D delivered by TriOviz for Games Technology
Green Lantern: Rise of the Manhunters	PS3, Xbox 360	2011	3D via HDMI standard for 3D HDTV, TriOviz INFICOLOR 3D glasses for 2D HDTV. 3D delivered by TriOviz for Games Technology
Captain America: Super Soldier	PS3, Xbox 360	2011	3D via HDMI standard for 3D HDTV, TriOviz INFICOLOR 3D glasses for 2D HDTV. 3D delivered by TriOviz for Games Technology
Gears of War 3	Xbox 360	2011	3D via HDMI standard for 3D HDTV. 3D delivered by TriOviz for Games Technology.
Batman: Arkham City	PS3, Xbox 360	2011	3D via HDMI standard for 3D HDTV, TriOviz INFICOLOR 3D glasses for 2D HDTV, 3D delivered by TriOviz for Games Technology., NVIDIA 3DVision
Assassin's Creed: Revelations	PS3, Xbox 360	2011	3D via HDMI standard for 3D HDTV, TriOviz INFICOLOR 3D glasses for 2D HDTV, 3D delivered by TriOviz for Games Technology.
Crysis 2	Windows, PS3, Xbox 360	2011	Windows : Nvidia 3D Vision, AMD HD3D, Dual-projectors, iZ3D monitor, Anaglyph mode, manual modes for 3D via HDMI standard PS3 and Xbox 360 : 3D via HDMI standard
The Ico & Shadow of the Colossus Collection	PS3	2011	3D via HDMI standard
Tom Clancy's Splinter Cell Trilogy	PS3	2011	3D via HDMI standard
MotorStorm: Apocalypse	PS3	2011	3D via HDMI standard
SOCOM 4	PS3	2011	3D via HDMI standard
Killzone 3	PS3	2011	3D via HDMI standard
Uncharted 3: Drake's Deception	PS3	2011	3D via HDMI standard
Battlefield 3	Windows	2011	Nvidia 3D Vision, AMD HD3D
Sonic Generations	PS3, Xbox 360, Windows	2011	3D via HDMI standard
Minesweeper 3D: The New Generation	Windows	2011	Anaglyph mode
Halo: Combat Evolved Anniversary	Xbox 360	2011	3D via HDMI standard
De Blob 2	Xbox 360, PS3	2011	3D via HDMI standard
3D-struction	Xbox 360	2011	3D via HDMI standard for 3D HDTV, Anaglyph Mode, Cross-Eyed Autostereoscopic
Deus Ex: Human Revolution	Windows, PS3, Xbox 360, Mac OS X	2011	Windows: AMD HD3D, NVIDIA 3DVision
Assassin's Creed III	Xbox 360, PS3, Wii U	2012	TriOviz INFICOLOR 3D glasses for 2D HDTV. 3D via HDMI standard on PS3
Dirt: Showdown	Windows	2012	
Test Drive Unlimited 2 (stereoscopic DLC)	Xbox 360, PS3, Windows	2011	Xbox 360 and PS3: Only with DLC, 3D via HDMI standard, Windows: NVIDIA 3DVision
Silent Hill: Downpour	PS3	2012	3D via HDMI standard
Max Payne 3	Windows, Xbox 360, PS3	2012	NVIDIA 3DVision
Sleeping Dogs	Windows, Xbox 360, PS3	2012	NVIDIA 3DVision
Doom 3 BFG Edition	Linux, Windows, PS3, Xbox 360	2012	Side-by-side, interleaved, NVIDIA 3DVision
Hitman: Absolution	Windows, PS3	2012	native AMD HD3D support
Crysis 3	Windows, PS3, Xbox 360	2013	Side-by-side, interlaced, NVIDIA 3DVision
Tomb Raider	Windows, PS3, Xbox 360	2013	native AMD HD3D support, NVIDIA 3DVision
Trine 2	Linux, Windows, MacOS, PS3, PS4, Xbox 360, Wii U	2013	Side-by-side, top-bottom, line-interlace, DLP-checkerboard, NVIDIA 3DVision, AMDHD3D, iZ3D
Daylight	Windows, PS4	2014	
The Pinball Arcade	PS3	2014	Patch for stereoscopic 3D support released for in 2014
Elite Dangerous	Windows, OS X, Xbox One	2015	Side-by-side, Anaglyph mode
Xonotic	Linux, Windows, Mac	2015	Anaglyph mode, LCD Shutter Glasses, side-by-side, head-mounted display, polarized stereo LCDs, if supported by drivers. As of version 0.8.0, the stereoscopic settings were missing in the menu, but could be set by changing variables "r_stereo_*" and "vid_stereobuffer" with in-game console.
Rise of the Tomb Raider	Windows	2016	Starting with patch 1.0.629.3: side-by-side (for 3D TVs), NVIDIA 3DVision, or AMD HD3D (On Steam version), Windows DXGI 1.2 Stereo 3D (On Windows Store version)
4D Toys	Windows, iOS	2017	virtual reality headset
Gridfighter 3D	MS-DOS, Linux, OS X	2017	side-by-side, head-mounted display (supports Forte VFX-1 and Oculus Rift DK1 natively, and compatible headsets via in-game geometry adjustments)
Shadow of the Tomb Raider	Windows	2018	side-by-side (for 3D TVs), NVIDIA 3DVision
Half-Life: Alyx	Windows, Linux	2020	virtual reality headset
Gran Turismo 6	PS3	2013	3D via HDMI Standard

== See also ==
- List of Nvidia 3D Vision Ready games
- List of Nintendo 3DS games
- List of Playstation games
- List of Wii U games
- List of Xbox 360 games
- 3D film
- Vectrex
- Disney Digital 3-D
- Dolby 3D
- Nintendo 3DS
- RealD Cinema
- Stereoscopy
- TDVision
- Virtual Boy
- Jaguar VR
