= Playworks Digital =

Smart TV video game publisher

PlayWorks Digital Limited
- Trade name: Play.Works
- Formerly: TransGaming Interactive Limited (2016–2017)
- Type: Subsidiary
- Industry: Digital media
- Founded: 9 June 2016; 10 years ago
- Founders: Jonathan Boltax; Oz Avni
- Headquarters: London, England
- Area served: Worldwide
- Owner: General Media Ventures
- Website: https://play.works/

PlayWorks Digital Limited, doing business as Play.Works, is a British video game publisher and creator economy company focused on the smart TV market. Founded in 2016, it distributes video games across a variety of platforms and operates dedicated video-on-demand applications as well as FAST channels for content creators. The company has offices in Tel Aviv, London, Kyiv, Seattle, Boulder and New York City.

== History ==
The company's origins date back to 1999, with the Israeli video game software developer Pixel Technologies founded by Ramy Weitz and Jeff Braun. Pixel created the multiplayer software called JIVE, which enabled cross-platform play in early mobile and interactive television platforms including Jasper Smith's PlayJam. In 2000, the company was acquired by GamePlay for $50 million in shares, before Weitz re-acquired the business for $1 due to the parent company's debt. In March 2005, Pixel was purchased by PlayTV, a New York-based company founded by former GT Interactive co-founder Ron Chaimowitz in 2002 to create video games for set-top boxes operated by cable and satellite television providers. The acquisition created a merged company that went by PixelPlay. Jonathan Boltax, who had previously served as the director of interactive television for Cablevision, joined the company's management team in February 2006. In June of that year, PixelPlay launched DishGames, an interactive subscription service that offered video games based on Hasbro and Atari properties, among others, to Dish Network users in the United States.

In July 2007, casual game company Oberon Media announced that it would acquire PixelPlay to expand its offering across mobile, television and web platforms. In 2008, Oberon launched the I-play brand across all of its publishing suite. At the 2010 Consumer Electronics Show, Oberon announced plans to offer games on Samsung's Internet TV platform as individual purchases, starting with Dream Day Wedding. The following month, Oberon launched Tetris TV for Dish Network as a $2.99 monthly subscription. In May, they announced plans to develop stereoscopic video games for 3D televisions. In October, they launched I-playTV for Dish Network, featuring games based on Deal Or No Deal as well as 1 vs. 100 alongside other licensed and original titles for $4 a month. At CES 2011, the company announced plans to expand the service to Panasonic's Viera Connect platform. At the same event, Oberon grew its Tetris partnership to include titles on multiple smart TV platforms, with the first launching as a single purchase standalone game on Samsung devices that June.

In January 2012, Canadian video game publisher TransGaming purchased Oberon's connected and interactive TV business for $7 million, with plans to merge the operation within their existing GameTree TV division. GameTree TV was founded in 2009 with support from Intel and launched its smart TV gaming business in April 2011 by offering casual games to Free subscribers in France through its Freebox Revolution set-top box. Initial monetization options included a single day or weekly rental, alongside buying access to the entire game, before monthly subscription bundles launched that November. During the same month as the acquisition's announcement, GameTree TV began integrating multi-screen capabilities with iOS and Android devices. The following July, TransGaming announced a partnership with hospitality telecommunications company Select-TV to offer GameTreeTV in Malaysian hotels, with it expanding to Holiday Inn locations across North America in September 2014. In October 2012, the company partnered with Visiware to launch Games Channel 96 on Dish Network, offering over 50 on-demand games. In December of that year, the company announced it had refreshed GameTree TV's interface, shifted it to a subscription-only business model and offered full support for Android set-top boxes.

In the years that followed, TransGaming would aggressively expand the service's device reach, including 2013 launches on Opera TV (the first to support free-to-play games with advertising), Roku, Panasonic Viera Connect and Philips smart TVs (the first to be written in HTML5), with Samsung, Toshiba, Sharp Aquos, Vizio and ActiveVideo in 2014, LG and Liberty Global in 2015, as well as Fire TV in 2016. In October 2014, it was announced that BulkyPix's Turbolab Pursuit would be the first GameTree TV title to support in-game microtransactions, with TransGaming confirming a partnership in January 2015 with Paymentwall to handle processing. TransGaming also introduced GameTree TV Casino in November 2015, the ad-free GameTree TV Gold that December, and alongside Visiware, Hopper Arcade for select Dish Hopper devices in January 2016. The next month, it was announced that GameTree TV had integrated Google's DoubleClick Ad Exchange to supply in-game video advertising.

=== As PlayWorks ===
TransGaming unveiled a proposal to exit the video game industry and transition to a real estate firm in May 2016. It sold the GameTree TV division to British company General Media Ventures, a new business headed by Jasper Smith, in August 2016. The deal was worth US$225,000. In 2017, the company announced plans to launch games on Comcast's Xfinity platform and changed its name to PlayWorks Digital. PlayWorks had been founded in Israel by Jonathan Boltax and Oz Avni in 2016. In 2018, Boltax was appointed as chief executive officer. In December 2019, PlayWorks launched the Tankee channel on Roku, becoming its first video-on-demand application. By October 2020, it began offering linear channels to FAST service providers featuring content creators. In 2026, PlayWorks started distributing podcasts on Spotify.

In March 2024, Sling TV launched Arcade in conjunction with PlayWorks, offering subscribers the ability to play games while simultaneously watching television. The following May, PlayWorks announced it had released a Pac-Man game for Roku, with a rollout on other connected TV platforms throughout the year. 2024 also marked the company's first foray into in-car entertainment, developing Trivia Crack for AirConsole's Volkswagen software and titles for LG's Automotive Content Platform on Kia vehicles.

In January 2025, the company helped launch GameLoop TV, an American digital broadcast television network in the United States that offers video games through internet connected ATSC 3.0 technology. As of August 2026, the channel is available in over 125 markets.

== Controversy ==
In August 2026, Norwegian IT security provider Mnemonic published an article revealing that many of the company's games on Samsung's Tizen platform included Bright Data's software development kit, potentially allowing players to have their personal internet connections used as residential proxies. This was preceded by an earlier report in June from Spur that noted similar activity in the company's titles for LG's webOS. Among others, PlayWorks' Pac-Man and 2048 Football Cup explicitly offers users an ad-free version of the game should they agree to join Bright Data's proxy network. LG and Samsung later announced plans to ban applications with residential proxy features.
