= 3D video game =

A 3D video game (three-dimensional video game) may refer to:

- a video game featuring 3D game graphics, which are computed in three directional dimensions
- a stereoscopic video game with a stereoscopic depth effect

== See also ==
- List of stereoscopic video games
- List of 3D PlayStation 3 games
- List of games with Nvidia 3D Vision support
- List of Nintendo 3DS games
