= Avatar: The Game =

2009 video game

- Developers: Ubisoft Montreal; Gameloft Barcelona (mobile)
- Publishers: Ubisoft; Gameloft (mobile)
- Composers: Chance Thomas; Inon Zur (Nintendo DS)
- Engine: Dunia (PlayStation 3, Windows, Xbox 360); Jade (Wii, PlayStation Portable)
- Platforms: Microsoft Windows; Nintendo DS; PlayStation 3 Wii; Xbox 360; PlayStation Portable iOS; Android
- Release: Microsoft Windows, Nintendo DS, PlayStation 3, Wii, Xbox 360: WW: December 1, 2009; PlayStation Portable: WW: December 7, 2009; iPhone: WW: December 14, 2009; iPad: WW: April 23, 2010; Android: WW: November 25, 2010
- Genres: action-adventure, Third-person shooter
- Modes: Single-player, multiplayer

Avatar: The Game is a 2009 third-person shooter action-adventure game based on the 2009 film Avatar. The game was developed by Ubisoft Montreal (with Gameloft Barcelona also for the mobile version) and published by Ubisoft. It was released on the PlayStation 3, Xbox 360, Microsoft Windows, Wii, and Nintendo DS on December 1, 2009, with a PlayStation Portable version later released on December 7. It uses the same technology as the film to be displayed in stereoscopic 3D. As of May 19, 2010, the game has sold nearly 2.7 million copies.

The game, which acts as a non-canon prequel to the film, features Sigourney Weaver, Stephen Lang, Michelle Rodriguez, and Giovanni Ribisi, who reprise their roles from the film. The casting and voice production for Avatar: The Game was handled by Blindlight.

The online services for the game were shut down on August 8, 2014.

== Gameplay ==
At first the player is allowed to choose the appearance of the character from a set of pre-defined faces. On the Xbox 360, PlayStation 3 and PC versions, the player is able to choose a side – to fight for the Na'vi or for the RDA – each offering different gameplay, weapon set, skill set, and environment.

As a soldier, the player is equipped with firearms such as assault rifles, shotguns, grenade launchers, and flamethrowers. The soldier generally has to eliminate the enemies, which are fast and resilient and usually charging towards the player, from afar. Playing as an Avatar limits the player to only one Avatar-issued machine gun and various primitive weapons such as bows, crossbows and melee weapons. The Avatar player usually has to charge the enemies since ranged weapon are either weak (the machine gun), have slow rate of fire (bows and crossbows), or have limited ammunition; the human enemies are generally weak and the basic foot soldiers can die after getting hit once with one strike of a club. The environment reacts differently to the character: many plants will attack the soldier, while the Avatar can walk past said plants unharmed. A variety of vehicles or mounts are also available to each race.

If the player's health is reduced to 0, they can use a recovery that instantly recovers to full health. Recoveries can be acquired by gathering cell samples left behind by killed creatures (including humans or Na'vi) or plants, but only 5 recoveries can be carried at any one time (excluding the PS3 version, which has a limit of 10). Avatar players can collect Cell Samples more easily from many plants without having to "kill" them. If the player falls to their death, however, he cannot use recoveries and have to reload from a check point which is automatically saved. The game offers no way to manually save when playing the game. A special case involves a separate checkpoint when the user decides which race to side with, which cannot be overwritten.

As the player completes mission objectives or eliminates opposition, the character gains experience points and levels up. Each level rewards the character with better versions of the weapons, armor and skills they already have. The character can have only one armor (one type of combat gear at a time, though with higher levels, different types become available, which may be selected instead of the original), four skills and four weapons equipped into quick slot at any one time. The skills can be offensive (boost damage, summon air strikes / wild life), defensive (boost damage resistance, heal) or tactical purpose (boost speed, invisibility).

Experience points are converted to credits that is used in the Conquer minigame. It is a Risk-style strategy game in which the player captures territories from enemies. Credits are used to buy troops, which has three types: infantry, heavy ground unit and air unit, defenses or limited special attacks. Some territories captured reward player with passive enhancements such as damage boost, critical chance, armor, health to use in the main game, as long as they are in the player's possession. (PlayStation 3 and Windows version)

The Wii version of the game uses the Wii Remote controller for combat, and the firing of bows. The Xbox 360 version has a wider range of controls and allows the player to ride animals and drive vehicles. The Nintendo DS version of the game is presented as a top down adventure game akin to The Legend of Zelda: Phantom Hourglass.

== Plot ==
Avatar: The Game is set in 2152, two years before the events of the film. The game starts out with a new signals specialist, named Able Ryder (who is either male or female, depending on the player's choice), arriving at Pandora, assigned to an area called Blue Lagoon, a large piece of jungle, fenced in to make sure no larger predators get inside. Their first mission is to save five marines from Viperwolves, with their CO suggesting they use a turret to help fend off the wolves. After saving the marines, Ryder must go help another Sig Spec, Dalton, who is afraid of the Viperwolves and trapped outside the fence.

Helping out at another base, Ryder is told to go fix the fences and animal repulsors, which are attracting creatures rather than keeping them away. After fixing the fences, Ryder is told to enter his avatar. Ryder's first mission in his avatar body is to get cell samples from certain non-hostile plants. After getting the samples, a Na'vi, Tan Jala, tells Ryder to kill his infected animals. A RDA air strike is seen being launched on the Na'vi village where Ryder had locked the signal. He finds out that there is a mole and that it is one of the avatar drivers. He follows Tan Jala, who leads him to the mole. After finding who the mole is, a scientist named Rene Harper, who is sympathetic with the Na'vi plight, Ryder sees the Na'vi village destroyed in the air strike. Commander Falco and his soldiers arrive via helicopter and try to force Rene into surrender. Harper tries to persuade Ryder to join the Na'vi and leave the RDA. When Falco hears this, he orders Ryder to shoot Rene Harper and keep his allegiance to the Corporation. Ryder must make a game-altering decision of siding with the defensive Na'vi or siding with the more offensive, better- armed RDA.

=== RDA Storyline ===
If the player sides with the RDA, Ryder, Commander Falco, and his soldiers corner Rene Harper, and he jumps from a cliff rather than surrender to the RDA. As Rene falls, he shoots Ryder in the chest with a bow and arrow. Their avatar is killed, but Ryder's human body survives.

As he returns to base on a Scorpion with Kendra, two banshees attack and force down the helicopter. No one is killed, but the pilot is hurt in the crash. Ryder is informed of a base near the crash site, and that he could use one of the aircraft. When he arrives, he finds the base is under attack by banshees, resulting in the destruction of many operational Scorpion and Samson helicopters, and causing many casualties. Ryder enters the control room, and the commander tells them to take a helicopter above and destroy the banshee nests, eradicating the threat. When Ryder returns to retrieve missiles from the crash site, they learn that the pilot died from his injuries. They reequip the missiles to the helicopter and complete the task, and the player can see that aerial reinforcements are arriving and battling any remaining banshees in the area. Ryder is ordered to collect three unobtainium shards so that with the help of them, they could extract the harmonic from a Willow Tree which would help the RDA to find The Well of Souls. Ryder collects the shards and extracts the harmonic. Ryder is again summoned at Hell's Gate and is given a new pilot as their previous pilot died from injuries. He meets with Dr. Monroe who tells them to feed the harmonic into a device called the Emulator. He explains to them that the Na'vi access the moon from a place called the Tree of Souls, but there is another dormant site called the Well of Souls and it could act like a back door entrance for them to cut the connection of the Na'vi from the moon. In order to pinpoint the location of the dormant site they needed enough harmonics.

Ryder is transported to a combat area known as the FEBA, where Na'vi warriors, under the legendary chieftain Beyda'amo, are inflicting death and destruction to the RDA and slowing the advance to a halt. At this point Ryder’s primary goal is to collect the shards and extract the harmonic. In the process, Ryder has to kill Beyda'amo. They are transported to Grave's Bog where along with collecting the shards and extracting the harmonic, Ryder has to kill Tan Jala. They go to The Hanging Gardens where they discover that Dr. Harper is still alive and working for the Na'vi with two other people. After killing them, Ryder learns that Commander Falco has gone rogue, stolen the Emulator, and killed Dr. Monroe.

Ryder travels to The Plains of Goliath for their final missions. Upon arrival Ryder is ordered to eliminate three Na'vi leaders and the first leader persuades him to join the Na'vi but the player can decline and kill the other leaders. Col. Miles Quaritch gives Ryder a Dragon Ship to go to Tantalus and get some charges from Boom Boom Batista to blow up the stone wall and get the Dragon Ship to access the Well of Souls, where Ryder finds Falco trying to activate the Emulator. After killing Falco, Ryder activates the Emulator and cuts the connection of the Na'vi behind them from Eywa. This finishes the game. However, if the player chooses to accept Swawta's request Ryder has to kill the RDA leaders instead.

=== Na'vi Storyline ===
If the player chooses to side with Rene Harper instead, they will kill Falco's men and wound Falco, forcing him to retreat. Rene and Ryder flee to Beyda'amo's village where Rene leaves with Tan Jala to lead a raid for his and Ryder's link chambers, instructing Ryder to earn Beyda'amo's trust. Beyda'amo reluctantly helps Ryder to undergo Iknimaya, receiving their own mountain banshee which Ryder uses to disrupt RDA operations in the area. However, upon Rene's return with the link chambers, the village comes under attack by Dragon Ships. Ryder downs one and repels the attack, but the link trailer is destroyed in the process, fatally wounding Ryder and Rene's human bodies.

Ryder's consciousness is permanently transferred to their avatar in order to save their life, but Rene dies of his injuries. Ryder is sent to find Lungoray who assigns them to find the Well of Souls before being killed by an RDA sniper. The Na'vi come to see Ryder as the legendary First Voice who will reawaken the dormant Well. At first denying this possibility, both Ryder and Beyda'amo realize that it may be true when Ryder is able to gather a harmonic without the help of the unobtanium shards. Throughout their missions, Ryder helps the Na'vi to fight off various RDA operations and attacks.

After locating the Well of Souls, Ryder is ordered to kill three RDA leaders. A Toruk offers itself as Ryder's mount for the final battle and he barely manages to beat Falco to the Well and activate the tree. The Well of Souls emits an EMP-like burst, destroying Falco's Dragon and killing him. However, Ryder warns Tan Jala that, in spite of their victory, more humans will come.

=== Other Versions ===
The Wii and PSP versions have a different storyline, where the player character is a young Na'vi named Raiuk who is the sole survivor of his clan after an RDA attack. He sets out on a personal vendetta to avenge his people and recover the stolen artifacts of his tribe, thereby preventing their complete extinction.

The Nintendo DS version of the game also has a different storyline as it revolves around a Na'vi boy named Nok who tries to stop the harmful biological research of RDA researcher Dr. Anthony Ossman with the help of Ossman's daughter Molly.

== Development ==
Ubisoft developed Avatar: The Game in conjunction with director James Cameron as he filmed Avatar. While Sigourney Weaver, Michelle Rodriguez, Giovanni Ribisi, and Stephen Lang reprised their voices for their characters, neither Sam Worthington, Zoe Saldaña, or their characters (Jake Sully and Neytiri) appeared in the game. The game was developed as an adaptation of the movie of the same name, with an original storyline and similar features. The developers had carte blanche from the film, leading to it becoming non-canon after the singular film became a franchise and the need to make Ubisoft´s followup Avatar: Frontiers of Pandora strictly adhere to the canon.

Composer Chance Thomas was hired to write the music for Avatar: The Game.

== 3D capabilities ==
The game requires an HDMI video connection and a 120 Hz capable display in order to make use of the 3D effects. Avatar: The Game has the option of outputting in most standard stereoscopic 3D formats used by today's "3D-enabled" screens with stereoscopic 3D. The release of the PC demo has confirmed the PC version of the game supports 3D capabilities as well.

According to Neil Schneider, executive director of the S-3D Gaming Alliance, NVIDIA has developed a proprietary method for NVIDIA's GeForce 3D Vision that allows left and right images to be passed directly from the game engine to the PC display, in the form of quad buffers. Up until Avatar, this was a limitation criticized by the gaming industry because they were forced to use NVIDIA's stereoscopic 3D driver when they would prefer to have full control of the S-3D gaming experience. Alternate solutions like iZ3D monitors, interlaced displays, dual output projectors and 3D Checkerboard DLP do not require this enhancement because game developers have full output control.

== Reception ==
Reception

Aggregate scores
Aggregator	Score
GameRankings	DS: 58%
Metacritic	PC: 59/100; PS3: 60/100; WII: 60/100; X360: 61/100 iOS: 78/100

Review scores
Publication	Score
Eurogamer	5/10
Game Informer	6.5/10
GameSpot	5.5/10; PSP: 4/10
GameTrailers	6.5/10
GameZone	7/10
Giant Bomb	2/5
IGN	iOS (iPhone): 7.8/10; Android: 7/10; PC: 6.8/10; PS3/X360 (AU): 6.8/10 iOS (iPad): 6/10; PS3/X360 (UK): 6/10; WII: 5.9/10
Nintendo Power	5/10
Official Xbox Magazine (US)	7.5/10
PC Gamer (US)	42%
TouchArcade	iOS: 4/5
The A.V. Club	iOS: A− X360: B−

On Metacritic, Avatar: The Game gained "mixed or average" reviews except for iOS version, which was met with "generally favorable" reviews.

=== Sales ===
Sales of the game had a slow start but eventually performed ahead of expectations selling 2.7 million units across all platforms. Ubisoft CEO Yves Guillemot called the game a "positive contribution for the company" citing the increased sales due to the film's success and its launch on DVD.

== See also ==
- Stereoscopic video game
- List of stereoscopic video games
