= LCD glasses =

LCD glasses may refer to:

- LCD shutter glasses, a special kind of 3D glasses
- Head-mounted display, a display to have video displayed in front of the eyes, often using LCD technology
