= Jasper Smith (disambiguation) =

Jasper Smith (born 1965) is an English entrepreneur.

Jasper Smith may also refer to:

- Jasper K. Smith (1905–1992), American politician
- Jasper Smith-Gordon (born 2002), British artistic gymnast
- Randle Jasper Smith (1908–1962), American judge
