= Cedega =

Cedega may refer to:

- a variety of grape used to make port wine
- Cedega (software) (formerly known as WineX) was TransGaming Technologies' proprietary fork of Wine
