= ICTV =

ICTV may refer to:

== Television ==
- ICTV, former company that eventually became CloudTV, a content distribution network for delivering the web-media experience through television
- ICTV (Ukraine), a television network of Ukraine
- Imperial College Television, a British student television station
- Indigenous Community Television, an Australian free-to-view digital television channel
- Ithaca College Television, Ithaca College student-run TV station in Ithaca, New York, US

== Other uses ==
- International Committee on Taxonomy of Viruses, an organisation that governs the taxonomy of viruses

== See also ==
- ICTV2
