= Wobulation =

General term for variation of a characteristic

Wobulation is the known variation ("wobble") in a characteristic. For example, wobulation of advanced radar waveform modulations – where the repetition rate or center frequency of a signal is changed in a repetitive fashion to reduce the probability of interception.

In large-screen television technology, wobulation is Hewlett-Packard's term for a form of interlacing designed for use with fixed-pixel displays. The term is loosely derived from the word 'wobble' and was inspired by HP's work with the overlap of printing ink. Wobulation reduces the cost and complexity of components required for the creation of high resolution TVs.

Wobulation works by overlapping pixels. It does so by generating multiple sub-frames of data while an optical image shifting mechanism (e.g. the mirror of a digital micromirror device) then displaces the projected image of each sub-frame by a fraction of a pixel (e.g. one-half or one-third). The sub-frames are then projected in rapid succession, and appear to the human eye as if they are being projected simultaneously and superimposed. For example, a high-resolution HDTV video frame is divided into two sub-frames, A and B. Sub-frame A is projected, and then the miniature mirror on a digital micromirror device switches and displaces sub-frame B one half pixel length as it is projected. When projected in rapid succession, the sub-frames superimpose, and create to the human eye a complete and seamless image. If the video sub-frames are aligned so that the corners of the pixels in the second sub-frame are projected at the centers of the first, the illusion of double the resolution is achieved, like in an interlaced CRT display. Thus a lower resolution fixed pixel device using wobulation can emulate the picture of a higher resolution fixed device, at a reduced cost.

As of 2007, wobulation is used only to double the horizontal resolution of a display, unlike CRT interlacing that doubles the vertical resolution. However, it is capable of doubling the vertical and horizontal resolution of an image (2× wobulation).

While wobulation can in theory be used in many types of display devices, it is currently primarily used in displays using Digital Light Processing (DLP). DLP is a Texas Instruments (TI) technology which relies on a Digital Micromirror Device (DMD) chip. TI calls its implementation of wobulation 'SmoothPicture'. Horizontal wobulation used in current TI products allows a DMD chip with a 960×1080 mirror array to produce a 1920×1080 pixel picture; most recent designs employed in 3D DLP sets use "offset-diamond pixel layout", where the mirrors form a "checkerboard pattern" array. Also, the image overlap inherent in the use of wobulation eliminates the 'screen door' effect common on other fixed pixel displays such as plasma and LCD, but may in some implementations also create some reduction in sharpness. Wobulation was used by a number of TV manufacturers, including Hewlett-Packard, Mitsubishi, RCA, Samsung, and Toshiba.
