= Thunder Ceptor =

1986 video game

- Developer: Namco
- Publisher: Namco
- Composer: Norio Nakagata
- Series: Thunder Ceptor
- Platform: Arcade
- Release: JP: July 1986
- Genre: Third-person shooter
- Mode: Single-player

Thunder Ceptor (Note: Japanese: サンダーセプター, Hepburn: Sandā Seputā) is a 1986 third-person shooter video game developed and published by Namco for arcades. It was released only in Japan in July 1986. A stereoscopic 3D sequel, 3-D Thunder Ceptor II, was released towards the end of the year.

== Gameplay ==
The player blasting away at enemies in the game's first level.

The player must take control of the eponymous Thunder Ceptor, a hyper-way fighter ship developed by the Federal Troops, which is equipped with a rapid-fire zapper cannon, and rocket artillery napalm bombs – it can possess up to five of these bombs at a time, and they will be replenished at the end of each command. It also has a radar (which is displayed in the centre of the screen), and its progress ("WAY") is displayed up at the top of the screen, along with its energy ("POWER") and its bomb ("ARMS"). Its condition is also displayed in the top-left corner of the screen (usually with an image of its blueprints), but shall change to say "CAUTION" or "ENERGY EMPTY" when a formation attack is heading towards it or it is reduced to four bars of power.

== Development and release ==
Thunder Ceptor was Namco's answer to Space Harrier, a similar arcade game published by rival Sega in 1985. It was one of Namco's most-powerful arcade games, posing custom DAC chips and a 12.2 MHz 68000 processor, the same one used in consoles like the Sega Genesis. The graphics were designed by Shigeki Toyama, an artist known for his work on games such as Xevious, Point Blank, and Galaxian3: Project Dragoon. Toyama made the graphics through a then-new pixel art program on a consumer-grade computer, which was written in BASIC. He also designed the arcade cabinet, which was a sit-down with a yoke controller and an accelerator pad. The music was composed by Norio Nakagata, who also composed for Namco's Genpei Tōma Den.

== Reception ==
In Japan, the arcade trade publication Game Machine listed Thunder Ceptor as being the fourth most popular arcade game of August 1986.

Retro Gamer, who compared it to Space Harrier and Star Wars, argued that the game had little to offer that made it stand out from other 3D shooters. They complained that the graphics looked rushed and blocky, but that the 3D perspective was unique and done well. Ultimately, they stated that Thunder Ceptor wasn't as refined as Sega and Atari's games, and recommended that readers play those instead.

== 3-D Thunder Ceptor II ==
3-D Thunder Ceptor II (Note: Japanese: サンダーセプター 2 3D, Hepburn: Sandā Seputā 2 3D) is a sequel released in December 1986. Its arcade cabinet incorporates stereoscopic 3-D technology. The 3-D image is generated using LCD shutter glasses, which is enhanced by a fresnel lens placed between the video screen and shutter glasses, giving the impression of large 3-D images coming near the player. It followed on the heels of several stereoscopic 3-D arcade games released by rival companies Irem, Sega and Taito.

The game was commercially successful in Japan, where it was tied with Street Fighter as the fifth highest-grossing arcade game of 1987.
