= Stereoscopic video game =

Video game which uses stereoscopic technologies

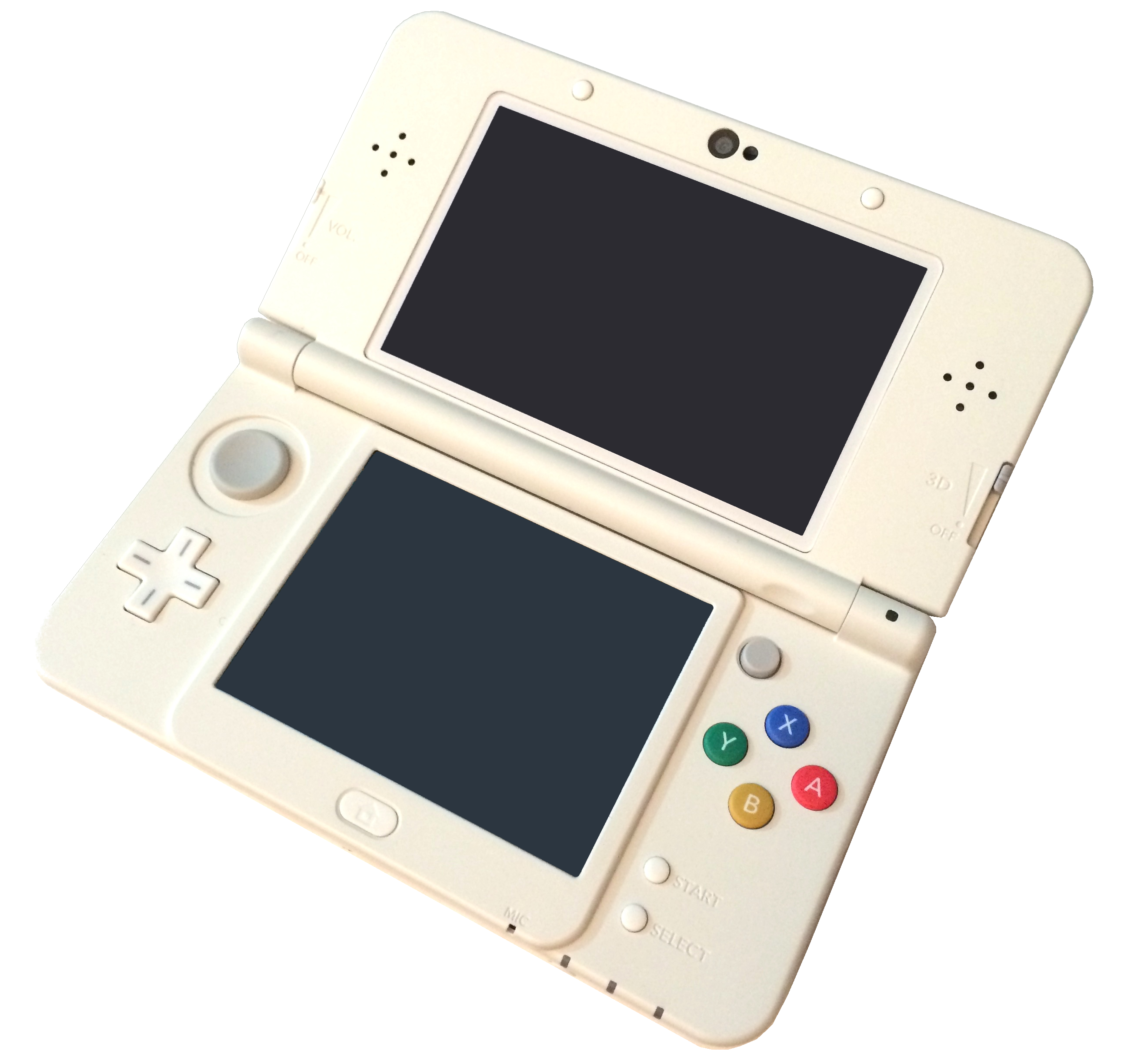
The New Nintendo 3DS uses parallax barrier autostereoscopy to display a 3D image.

A stereoscopic video game (also S-3D video game) is a video game which uses stereoscopic technologies to create depth perception for the player by any form of stereo display. Such games should not be confused with video games that use 3D game graphics on a mono screen, which give the illusion of depth only by monocular cues but lack binocular depth information.

== Description ==
Stereoscopic video games have been available for several years for PCs through the Nvidia 3D Vision and other platforms including AMD HD3D, DDD TriDef that use compatible hardware and active shutter 3D glasses. For video game consoles, however, stereoscopic 3D support must be specifically built into each game. Potential stereoscopic game support is available, for instance, on Xbox 360, PlayStation 3, Xbox One, Wii U and PlayStation 4. Nintendo 3DS is fully designed for autostereoscopic games.

Although no longer considered a key feature for successful game development by as many as during the stereoscopic 3D hype in 2010, stereoscopic support for video games is still considered a minor enhancement to video games. Many individuals consider it to be the most significant enhancement to video games. One of the reasons for the technology's lack of success was that the surprise effect quickly wears off.

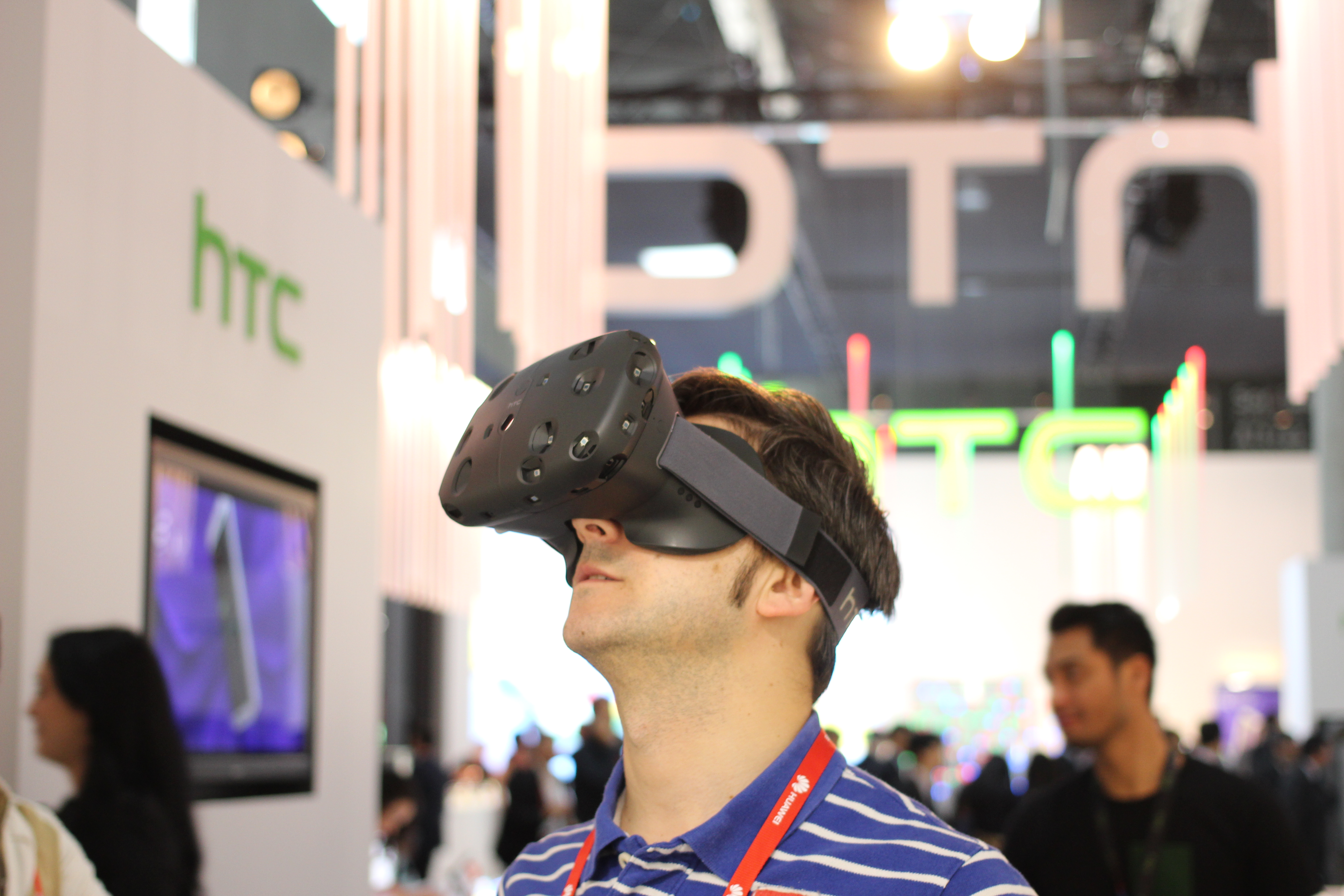
A HTC Vive that is designed for virtual reality gaming with stereo 3D graphics

A study at the University of Derby showed that converted 2D games do not transfer very well to stereoscopic 3D and concluded: "... games targeted to stereoscopic 3D audiences and devices must be designed from the start with stereoscopic 3D in mind." Therefore, stereo video games must have elements that can only be achieved in S-3D for a proper stereoscopic immersion.

For example, in the game Super Stardust HD, asteroids stand out from the plane. It makes navigation easier and serves a fundamental purpose. Super Mario 3D Land is another example for easier navigation and furthermore the game plays with depth, e.g. with Escher-style perspective puzzles.

Developers also need to mind perceptual problems such as stereo window violations and occlusion of virtual objects. Another scientific paper showed that S3D vision can measurably change player behavior depending on actual game design.

Recent developments of consumer virtual reality headsets such as for example Oculus Rift, HTC Vive, PlayStation VR, Fove, and Open Source Virtual Reality also include stereoscopic support as one of their features. The entire development trend of games and other software for such head-mounted displays remains to be seen.

== Rendering techniques ==
There are two primary rendering techniques employed in stereoscopic video games: 2D + depth rendering, and dual rendered 3D.

=== 2D + depth rendering ===
This technique generates a second point of view from a single rendered image. It has an upper limit on how much parallax can be created. 2D+ can be compared to 2D to 3D conversion techniques for 3D films. Several video games for Xbox 360 and PS3 used this method.

=== Dual rendering ===
This technique renders two images. It creates the best stereoscopic effect but has double system requirements for graphic rendering and higher production demands.

== History ==
=== 1980s ===
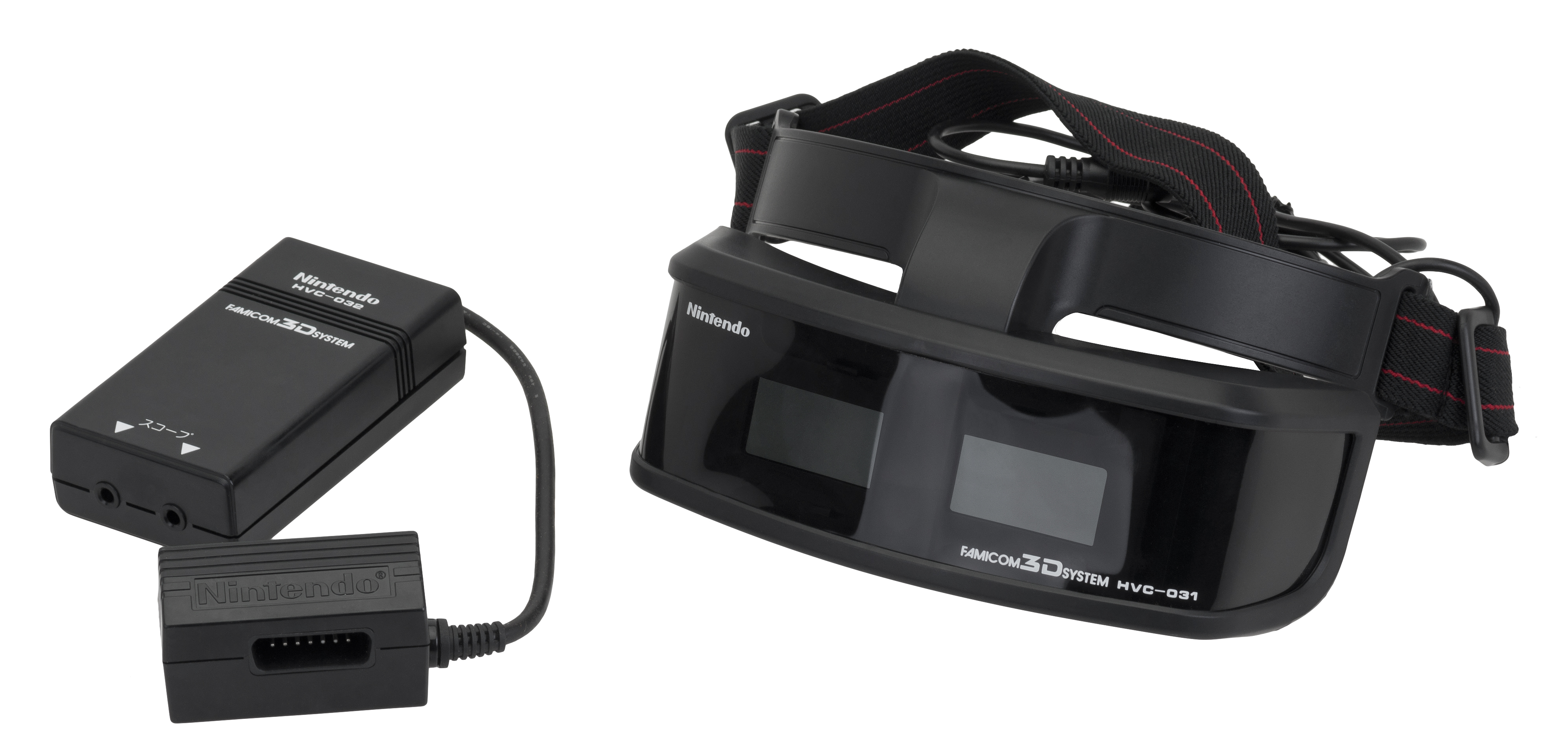
Famicom 3D System, released in 1987 for Japan only

Sega released the world's first commercial stereoscopic video game, SubRoc-3D, in 1982. This arcade game introduced an active shutter 3D system, jointly developed by Sega with Matsushita (now Panasonic). In 1983, the first model of the TomyTronic series of gaming laptop LCD game & watch-type stereoscopic 3D was released by Takara Tomy. A 3D imager for the console Vectrex vector, a pair of 3D glasses using a rotating color wheel synchronized with the display was released by Smith Engineering in 1984.

Battle Bird, developed by Irem, was released in Japan in January 1986, and demonstrated at London's Amusement Trades Exhibition International (ATEI) show the same month. It was a space shooter that used Irem's 3D Vision system, which displayed stereoscopic 3D color graphics using a complex 3D system consisting of a dual-monitor setup, a half-silvered mirror, and a viewer with a polarizing filter for each eye. Upon its debut in early 1986, Mike Roberts of Computer Gamer magazine called it "the best example of the 3D effect that" he had ever seen. However, only a small number of arcade cabinets were manufactured. Taito also developed an unsuccessful 3D arcade game, followed by Namco with 3-D Thunder Ceptor II (1986), which generates 3D images using LCD shutter glasses enhanced by a Fresnel lens placed between the glasses and video screen, giving the impression of large 3D images coming near the player.

In 1987, the shutter-based SegaScope 3D Glasses for the Master System home console was released, and the Famicom 3D System for Nintendo's Famicom (NES) was launched only in Japan but met with limited success. The Taito Z System arcade game Continental Circus, the first stereoscopic 3D racing video game, also released in 1987. The SegaScope 3D, Famicom 3D System and Continental Circus all used active shutter 3D glasses. In 1988, the X-Specs 3D glasses including 3D game SpaceSpuds for Amiga were brought out by Haitex.

=== 1990s ===
In 1991, the Sega VR was announced and demonstrated, a virtual reality helmet that was never distributed. In 1993 Pioneer released the LaserActive system which had a bay for various "PAC's" including the Sega PAC and the NEC PAC. The unit was 3D capable with the addition of the LaserActive 3D goggles (GOL-1) and an adapter (ADP-1). The Virtual Boy was brought out in 1995, a console equipped with a virtual reality helmet that provided a stereoscopic rendering of 384x224 pixels per eye in monochrome (black and red) and for which 12 games were available in late 1995. Marketing was a dismal failure and production was halted in late 1996. SimulEyes PC VR goggles (a consumer version of CrystalEyes), bundled with the game Descent: Destination Saturn, was released in 1995.

In early 1997, Sega demonstrated an early glasses-free 3D display system, called the Floating Image System. It displayed 3D imaging based on a multi-layer parallax system, and was presented by Sega AM3's general manager Hisao Oguchi.

Metabyte produced Wicked Vision, the first driver that made a half-resolution stereo (sync doubling) of more than fifty gaming PC (Glide, Direct3D and miniOpenGL) 3Dfx Voodoo2 graphics card with infrared glasses H3D in 1998. A year later, Elsa Revelator released a similar driver for Direct3D that provided full resolution (page flipping) for stereo 3D on different graphics cards.

=== 2000s ===
The Glasstron by Sony, mounted on a clear head

The GameCube (and Game Boy Advance to a lesser extent) had been built with Stereoscopic capabilities in mind, however the cost for the liquid crystals technology were prohibitively expensive at the time to make commercial sense.

In 2001, NVIDIA brought out a driver based on Elsa technology that supported different types of glasses and screens, but only with their own graphics cards. The PUD-J5A for the PlayStation 2 was released in 2002, which incorporated virtual helmet technology (Glasstron) and was sold exclusively on the internet in Japan. It weighed 320 grams (11 oz), and used two screens of 108,000 pixels each (probably 450x240 pixels) and had a single game (Energy Airforce Aim Strike!).

In 2005, the game Metal Gear Acid 2 was released on the PlayStation Portable from Sony with a stereoscopic rendering via the "Solid Eye" accessory that included a stereoscope lens cardboard that could never be reused. The EyeFX 3D shutter glasses for the PlayStation 2 was produced by SplitFish Gameware in 2006. This plugged into a joystick port of the console and added support for stereoscopic 3D in ten existing games. The 3D Vision kit for the latest generation of NVIDIA graphics cards was brought out in 2001, and combines a pair of LC shutter glasses as well as a wireless infrared transmitter connected to a USB driver for Windows.

=== 2010s ===
In 2010, stereoscopic support for the PlayStation 3 was released via an automatic update of firmware. The new software includes a function for detection of 3D displays and a stereoscopic frame-buffer support. The first games in stereoscopic 3D included Wipeout HD and Super Stardust HD and coincided with the release of the 3D TV Bravia brand also by Sony. In the same year, a 3D Surround kit was brought out that works with the 3D Vision and several NVIDIA graphics cards with stereoscopic 3D support. The AMD HD3D added HDMI 1.4 support on ATI graphics cards for games in stereoscopic 3D using the drivers provided by iZ3D 3D stereo also in 2010.

In October 2010 Josef Kunz published the app 'Difficult' in the apple appstore, a skill game, that uses a Side-by-side view, the first available 3D game for handhelds.

The Nintendo 3DS, the first handheld with an autostereoscopic display using a parallax barrier and a resolution of 400x240 pixels per eye for stereoscopic 3D, was first produced in 2011. An XL version was released in 2012, as well as the non-stereoscopic Nintendo 2DS in 2013. This was followed by the New Nintendo 3DS and its XL version in 2015. These have a feature known as "Super Stable 3D", which uses a sensor to detect the viewing angle of the player and adjust the autostereoscopic display as required to maintain the same stereoscopic effect at a wider viewing angle.

== See also ==
- List of stereoscopic video games
- List of Nvidia 3D Vision Ready games
- List of Nintendo 3DS games
- List of PlayStation 3 games with 3D support
- List of Wii U games
- List of Xbox 360 games with 3D support
- 3D film
