= Findev =

Real-estate investing company

Findev Inc.
- Type: Public
- Traded as: TSX-V: FDI
- Industry: Real estate investing
- Founded: 2001; 25 years ago
- Founders: Gavriel State
- Headquarters: Toronto, Ontario, Canada
- Key people: Sruli Weinreb, CEO
- Revenue: ▲$2 million USD
- Operating income: ▼$0.25 million USD
- Net income: ▼$0.5 million USD
- Website: findev.ca

Findev Inc. (formerly TransGaming Inc.) is a Canadian real estate investing company, with its head office in Toronto. It is involved in property development within the Greater Toronto Area. The company is aligned with Plazacorp, a property development company, which is its major shareholder. The current CEO is Sruli Weinreb.

The company was formerly a Macintosh video game porting company founded by Gavriel State, who ran the Linux product division at Corel. TransGaming's Graphics and Portability Group was acquired by NVIDIA in 2015, paving the way to NVIDIA's first office in Toronto, Canada.

In 2016, TransGaming Inc. decided to change its business focus from technology and gaming to real estate financing. In August 2016 its last remaining gaming division, GameTree TV, with its subsidiaries and offices in Tel Aviv and Kyiv, were sold to TransGaming Interactive UK Limited - a subsidiary of General Media Ventures based in the United Kingdom. This company, now renamed to PlayWorks Digital Ltd., carries on the former GameTree TV business under the PlayWorks name.

== Former technology products ==
=== Cider ===
Cider was a technology marketed towards developers that allowed Windows games to run on Mac OS X. It shared much of the same core technology as Cedega but was designed for video game designers and publishers. Like Cedega, Cider was a proprietary fork of Wine.

At the 2007 Worldwide Developer Conference (WWDC07), Electronic Arts announced their return to the Mac, publishing various titles simultaneously on both PCs and Macs, using Cider on the Mac.

In a newsletter dated 2007-11-13, the company announced that Cider's improvements will be merging back into Cedega.

=== GameTree Linux ===
GameTree Linux was a developer program dedicated to further developing Cedega, a compatibility layer for running Microsoft Windows games on Linux. There are games that run on Cedega but not on wine, and games that run on wine but not Cedega. Users that want to play a specific game usually look for it on the games databases available on the web.

=== SwiftShader ===
SwiftShader is a high-performance CPU-based implementation of the Vulkan graphics API. Its goal is to provide hardware independence for advanced 3D graphics. It contains shaders and other Direct3D 8/9 class capabilities. SwiftShader was sold to Google in 2015 for US$1.25 million. It is currently used in Google Chrome as well as in Apple's Safari Web Browser to render 3D content. SwiftShader is built around two major optimizations that affect its architecture: dynamic code generation, and parallel processing. Generating code at run-time allows to eliminate code branches and optimizes register usage, specializing the processing routines for exactly the operations required by each draw call. Parallel processing means both utilizing the CPU's multiple cores and processing multiple elements accoss the width of the SIMD vector units.

=== GameTree TV ===
In 2010 TransGaming launched their new app, GameTree TV, a cloud-based, on-demand entertainment platform for Smart TV. In 2012 TransGaming acquired the connected TV division of Oberon Media and integrated them into their GameTree TV platform.

=== Digital rights management (DRM) ===
In a press release dated 2008-08-20, TransGaming announced that they "will utilize Sony DADC's SecuROM digital rights management (DRM) solution for all video game titles enabled through TransGaming's Cider portability engine for Mac games." TransGaming's use of SecuROM is notable because of the company's decision to use SecuROM technology for all Mac games enabled through Cider, irrespective of distribution channel (download vs. retail) and whether SecuROM was used for a game's Windows PC release.
