= Continental Circus =

1987 video game

- Commodore 64 Cover
- Developer: Taito
- Publisher: Taito
- Composer: Zuntata
- Platforms: Arcade, Amiga, Amstrad CPC, Atari ST, Commodore 64, MSX, ZX Spectrum
- Release: December 1, 1987: Arcade; JP: December 1, 1987; NA: Late 1987; EU: 1988 Amiga; EU: 1989 Amstrad CPC; EU: 1989 Commodore 64; NA: 1989; EU: 1989 MSX; EU: 1989 ZX Spectrum; EU: 1989
- Genre: Racing
- Mode: Single-player
- Arcade system: Taito Z System

Continental Circus is a racing arcade video game developed and published by Taito in 1987. In 1989, ports for the Amiga, Amstrad CPC, Atari ST, Commodore 64, MSX, and ZX Spectrum were published by Virgin Games.

The arcade version comes in both upright and sit-down models, both of which use shutter-type 3D glasses hanging above the player's head. According to Computer and Video Games in 1988, it was "the world's first three dimensional racing simulation". The home conversions of Continental Circus lack the full-on 3D and special glasses of the arcade version.

Circus is a common term for racing in France and Japan, likely stemming from the Latin term for a racecourse.

In 2005, the game was made available for the PlayStation 2, Xbox, and PC as part of Taito Legends.

== Gameplay ==
Arcade screenshot

The in-game vehicle is the 1987 Camel-sponsored Honda/Lotus 99T Formula One car as driven by Ayrton Senna and Satoru Nakajima. Due to licensing reasons, sponsor names such as "Camel" or "DeLonghi" are intentionally misspelled to prevent copyright infringement under Japanese law.

The player must successfully qualify in eight different races to win. At the beginning, the player must take 80th place or better to advance. As the player advances, so does the worst possible position to qualify. If the player fails to meet to qualify or if the timer runs out, the game is over. The player does, however, have the option to continue, but if the player fails to qualify in the final race, the game is automatically over, and the player cannot continue.

=== Hazards ===
As in the real F1 races, the car is susceptible to damage from contact with another car. Once a player hits a car or a piece of the trackside scenery, they will be called into the pits. If they let the car smoke too long, it will catch fire, and the message "IMPENDING EXPLOSION" will appear. Either way, if they fail to make it back or hit another car, then they will crash or explode, costing several seconds.

Also, if the car reaches speeds in excess of 380 km/h, the speedometer will turn yellow as a warning to the player to let them know the car is going much too fast. If the car hits another car from behind, the collision will send the car into a devastating cartwheel until it explodes, costing several seconds.

In the same light, going too fast through a turn will cause the car to lose grip on the road. If the car loses grip, it will spin out of control. There's a low chance of a wreck happening, but this will definitely take several seconds off the clock. Also, from time to time, a thunderstorm will occur, causing the track to become wet, and causing the car to lose traction. In that case, the message "CHANGE TIRES" will appear, and the player must immediately get into the pits to change to wet-tyres. If the storm dies down, the road will be covered in puddles. This does not pose a threat.

== Audio ==
Continental Circus does not have music during the race, but plays intro/outro music for each race in the vein of Pole Position. Afterwards, the screen cuts to the start line of the race course, and the announcement, "Gentlemen, start your engines! 30 seconds before the start!" The spoken line was lifted from the 1972 French documentary, which this game bears the same name.

The entire collection of musical scores, sound effects, and voice clips were featured in a compilation soundtrack known as "究極TIGER -G.S.M.TAITO 2-". The musical score was composed by Zuntata, Taito's house band. The music in the home versions was composed by Ben Daglish.

== Reception ==
Reception

Award
Publication	Award
Amstrad Action	Mastergame

The game was commercially successful. Its arcade pre-orders surpassed Taito's previous hit Operation Wolf (1987). In Japan, Game Machine listed Continental Circus on their April 15, 1988 issue as being the third most-successful upright arcade unit of the month. In the United Kingdom, it reached number-two on the monthly Coinslot dedicated arcade game chart in 1988, behind Street Fighter.

The January 1989 issue of Sinclair User gave it the award for 1988 "Cock-Up of the Year" because of the title Continental Circus appearing to spell "circuit" incorrectly.

As a home conversion, the game went to number 2 on the UK sales chart, behind Sega's Power Drift.
