= Cedega (software) =

- Developer(s): TransGaming Technologies
- Final release: 7.3 / June 2, 2009; 15 years ago
- Operating system: Linux
- Type: Compatibility layer
- License: X11 license

Cedega (formerly known as WineX) was the proprietary fork by TransGaming Technologies of Wine, from the last version of Wine under the X11 license before switching to GNU LGPL. It was designed specifically for running games created for Microsoft Windows under Linux. As such, its primary focus was implementing the DirectX API. WineX was renamed to Cedega on the release of version 4.0 on June 22, 2004.

Cedega Gaming Service was retired on February 28, 2011. TransGaming announced that development would continue under the GameTree Linux Developer Program, however this proved moot as the company's core technology divisions were shuttered in 2016.

== Licenses ==
Though Cedega was mainly proprietary software, TransGaming did make part of the source publicly available via CVS, under a mix of licenses. Though this was mainly done to allow a means for the public to view and submit fixes to the code, it was also frequently used as a means to obtain a quasi-demonstration version of Cedega. TransGaming released a proper demo of Cedega because of complaints of the difficulty of building a usable version of the program from the public CVS, as well as its outdated nature. The demo released by Cedega gave users a 14-day trial of a reasonably current version of the product with a watermark of the Cedega logo which faded from almost transparent to fully opaque every few seconds. This demo was removed without comment.

While the licenses under which the code was released do permit non-commercial redistribution of precompiled public-CVS versions of the software, TransGaming strongly discouraged this, openly warning that the license would be changed if they felt that abuse was occurring or otherwise threatened. TransGaming similarly discouraged source-based distributions like Gentoo Linux from creating automated tools to let people build their own version of Cedega from the public CVS.

The Wine project originally released Wine under the same MIT License as the X Window System, but owing to concern about proprietary versions of Wine not contributing their changes back to the core project, work as of March 2002 has used the LGPL for its licensing.

== Functionality ==
In some cases it closely mimicked the experience that Windows users have (insert disc, run Setup.exe, play). In other cases some amount of user tweaking is required to get the game installed and in a state of playability. Cedega 5.2 introduced a feature called the Games Disc Database (GDDB) that simplifies many of these settings and adds auto-game detection when a CD is inserted so that settings are applied for the inserted game automatically.

A basic list of features:

- Some types of copy protection
- Pixel Shaders 3.0
- Vertex Shaders 3.0
- DirectX 9.0
- Joystick support including remapping axes
- The ability to run some Windows games

== History ==
Cedega subscribers dwindled as users expressed a number of complaints due to lack of updates, fatal problems with supported games and with Wine having achieved a number of features that were unique to Cedega, giving even better compatibility in some cases. Users attributed the apparent lack of interest from TransGaming on Cedega to their focus on Cider, a similar Wine-based API layer for Mac OS X systems, supported by Electronic Arts to bring their Windows native games to Mac.

On November 13, 2007's Development Status report, TransGaming explained that a number of modifications had been made to Cedega's code to add Wine's implementation of the MSI installation system and to be able to incorporate more of Wine's codebase. It was never confirmed if those changes were in conformance with Wine's LGPL license.

Also on the November 13, 2007 report, it was announced that all of the work done on Cider would be merged back into Cedega (since both share the same code). Among the new features are “new copy protection, 2.0 shader updates, a head start on shader model 3.0, performance upgrades, a self-updating user interface” and others. On September 23, 2008, Cedega officially presented the new version 6.1.

Cedega Gaming Service was retired on February 28, 2011.

== Controversy ==
TransGaming's business practice of benefiting financially from the Wine project, without contributing anything back to it drew criticism. TransGaming obtained the source to the original Wine project when it was under the MIT License and this license placed no requirements on how TransGaming published the software. TransGaming decided to release their version as proprietary software.

Cedega included licensed support for several types of CD-based copy protection (notably SecuROM and SafeDisc), the code for which TransGaming said they were under contract not to disclose. They had initially pledged to release their code if they reached 20,000 subscribers, but this never actually happened.

In 2002, the Wine project changed its license to the GNU Lesser General Public License (LGPL). This means that anyone who publishes a modified version of Wine after the license change must publish the source code under an LGPL-compatible license. TransGaming halted using code contributed to Wine when the license was changed, though this later resumed with TransGaming integrating certain LGPL portions of Wine into Cedega and placing those portions of the source code on their public servers.

TransGaming offered a CVS tree for Cedega without the Point2Play GUI, copy protection support, and texture compression through its own repositories with mixed LGPL, AFPL and bstring licensing.

Scripts and guides have been made by the community to facilitate building Cedega from the source tree.

== See also ==
- Wine — the free software/open source software on which Cedega is based.
- WINE@Etersoft — another commercial proprietary Wine-based product.
- CrossOver — another commercial proprietary Wine-based product, targeted at running productivity/business applications and, recently, games.
