= Falsion =

1987 video game

- Developer: Konami
- Publisher: Konami
- Composers: Shinya Sakamoto; Shigehiro Takenouchi; Atsushi Fujio
- Platform: Famicom Disk System
- Release: JP: October 21, 1987
- Genre: Shoot 'em up
- Mode: Single-player

Falsion (ファルシオン, Farushion) is an on-rail 3D shoot-'em-up produced by Konami that was released for the Family Computer Disk System on October 21, 1987, in Japan. It is one of the few games compatible with the Famicom 3D System peripheral.

== Plot ==
The game's background story is only explained through the user manual. In the game's universe, humanity has colonized most planets in our galaxy, the Milky Way, and they now look towards expanding their reach by using an experimental travel technology called "Hyperzone Drive". However, a race of aliens who have already mastered that technology are currently invading planets at a quick pace, closing in on the Solar System. The invaders attack humanity's colony on Pluto and conquer it with little resistance, since human civilization doesn't have the technology to defend itself.

The human organization responsible for the space program, the "United Space Force", decides to use the yet-untested "Hyperzone Drive" in order to send ships that will directly attack the armies of the invading aliens. However, the new technology proves hard to control, and only one of the ships manages to survive the trip: the protagonist's ship, named Falsion. The story of the game itself deals with the Falsion's attack on the alien forces, and its eventual victory over the alien mothership, called "Gigantos", which serves as the game's final boss.

== Gameplay ==
The game is a shoot 'em up in which the player controls the movements of a flying space ship, called the Falsion, while simultaneously shooting enemy ships and trying to avoid their attacks. The goal of the game is to survive to the end of the auto-scrolling levels and defeat the boss to move on to the next level, until the sixth and final boss is defeated.

In a manner that has been compared to games like Space Harrier and Star Fox, the player's perspective is from the third person, behind the space ship, as it goes forward. Enemies, projectiles and obstacles seem to fly towards the space ship. Enemies can be attacked by shooting a rapid-firing beam weapon or homing missiles, although there is a limited supply of the latter. Randomly appearing power-ups which float around the screen for a limited time can also be collected by the player, and they either increase the ship's movement speed or replenish its missile supply. To survive, the player must avoid getting hit by enemies and obstacles or their attacks. The player can also destroy these enemies, which include other space ships, meteorites and robots. A 3D mode can be enabled during gameplay by pressing the "Select" button, allowing stereoscopic visuals viewable with the Famicom 3D System.

== Reception and legacy ==
The game received mixed reviews. Atari HQ praised Falsion's fluidity and called its 3D mode a great experience, saying the game is a "must-get". Another reviewer found the depth perception confusing and while they praised the game's music and said this was the best Famicom 3D System title, it remained "a pain to play".

Despite the similarity in name, the "Falchion β" ship in Gradius Gaiden is not based on the "Falsion" ship featured in this game.
