= PlayJam =

- Formerly: Static 2358
- Industry: Gaming and hardware industry
- Founded: April 28, 1997
- Founder: Jasper Smith
- Defunct: 2023
- Headquarters: London, United Kingdom Tokyo, Japan California, USA
- Website: https://playjam.com/

PlayJam is an old British-Japanese interactive casual game network and gaming hardware manufacturer. The network has been once available across digital TV, mobile, and online platforms.

The network emerged during the dawn of the digital TV era as a side project of London-based visual media company, Static 2358. Static's artists, designers, and programmers started producing casual games to work on set top boxes. PlayJam, which was launched in 1999 on CanalSat in France and Sky Digital in the UK, was one of the first ever interactive television broadcast channels. PlayJam quickly became one of the highest rated brands on digital TV, delivering interactive television services for clients such as the BBC, Glaxo SmithKline, pop band Gorillaz, ITV and Channel 4.

Static and PlayJam were sold to Open TV for $68 million in 2001. The interactive games platform appeared on millions of digital TV homes throughout the US, Europe, Asia and Africa.

Founder Jasper Smith re-acquired Static from Open TV in 2008, believing the adoption of internet connected TVs would allow PlayJam to become one of the world's pre-eminent games networks. The company had secured distribution deals with Apple, Sony, Samsung, LG, Panasonic, Western Digital, and other online gaming platforms to add to its network of digital TV homes around the world and online. PlayJam aims to create a 'connected' games network over the next few years, delivering a more integrated and accessible user experience alongside a cross-platform reward scheme to fuel further frequent and loyal usage. During the last 5 years, PlayJam has generated over 8 billion downloads from its library of 550 free titles. PlayJam's SDK enables other games developers to publish titles to this platform, most recently Relentless and Puzzler Media.

PlayJam became a founder member of the Connected TV Game Forum, alongside Accedo Broadband, Betfair, Rallypoint and Two Way Media in January 2010. Aiming to galvanize a common approach to gaming requirements for connected TV devices including functionality, features, and open standards, the forum's members view online games as a major driver in the multi-platform digital entertainment arena, attracting 38% of Internet users and generating billions of downloads via mobile and digital TV platforms. The Forum believes such games will act as "a prime motivator for consumers to connect their TVs to the Internet."

In October 2011, PlayJam secured $5 million investment from GameStop Digital Ventures, Adobe Ventures, Endeavour Ventures and the Angel CoFund to fuel further growth and capitalize on the smart TV market. The company has partnered with a number of game developers including GameHouse, First Star Software, Relentless Software, Slingo, and Puzzler to distribute popular titles across its network.

In 2013, PlayJam released the now discontinued GameStick. which was considered a commercial failure.
