= SubRoc-3D =

1982 video game

- Developer(s): Sega; Matsushita Electric
- Publisher(s): Sega
- Director(s): Shikanosuke Ochi
- Platform(s): Arcade, ColecoVision
- Release: Arcade: JP: March 1, 1982; NA: August 1982; EU: January 1983; ColecoVision: October 1983
- Genre(s): Shooter
- Mode(s): Single-player

SubRoc-3D (サブ・口ック3D SabuRokku-3D) is a first-person arcade shooter game released in 1982 by Sega. It is the first commercial video game in stereoscopic 3-D, using a periscope-shaped display with a different image for each eye. It was jointly developed by Sega and Matsushita Electric (now Panasonic), who developed its active shutter 3D system. The game has stereo sound, and also changes the backdrop to reflect day, night, dawn, and dusk.

The game was a commercial success for Sega in arcades. It was adapted for ColecoVision as SubRoc, with simulated 3D effects, by Arnold Hendrick and Philip Taterczynski of the Coleco game design staff, with programming by David Wesely of 4D Interactive Systems.

== Hardware ==
The stereoscopic 3D effect is achieved with an active shutter 3D system. It uses a special eyepiece, a viewer with spinning discs to alternate left and right images to the player's eyes from a single monitor. The player's face is pressed against the eyepiece, which is shaped like a submarine periscope and attached to a controller below. The game's pseudo-3D visuals are created with scaled sprites using the VCO Object hardware, previously used in Sega's 1981 racing game Turbo.

== Development and release ==
The game's active-shutter 3-D technology was developed by Matsushita Electric (now Panasonic) for a 3D television they had developed in the late 1970s and unveiled in 1981. The game began development around 1980, when Sega and Matsushita began discussing a "Stereo Viewer System" to adapt Matsushita's 3D television for video game use. Sega's director of technology for the project was Shikanosuke Ochi, who previously led the development of 1966 arcade electro-mechanical game Periscope. At the Amusement & Music Operators Association (AMOA) show in 1981, 3D images from the game were demonstrated on video tape.

Sega held a press conference on February 20, 1982 and demonstrated the first trial unit at the NOA Expo on March 1, 1982, the date when the game was first published. Several game changes were made before it entered mass-production in Japan on July 2, 1982, in North America in August 1982, and in Europe by January 1983.

== Reception ==
The game was a commercial arcade success for Sega in 1982.

Computer and Video Games magazine gave the arcade version a generally favorable review, for providing a "3D feel" and further advancing the "3D look" of Zaxxon (1982). Ray Dimetrosky of Computer Games magazine gave the ColecoVision port a B rating, stating that the graphics are "particularly impressive" but otherwise calling it "an above average shoot 'em up".

== See also ==
- Periscope, Sega's electromechanical submarine periscope game of the 1960s
