= Famicom 3D System =

Accessory for the Nintendo Family Computer

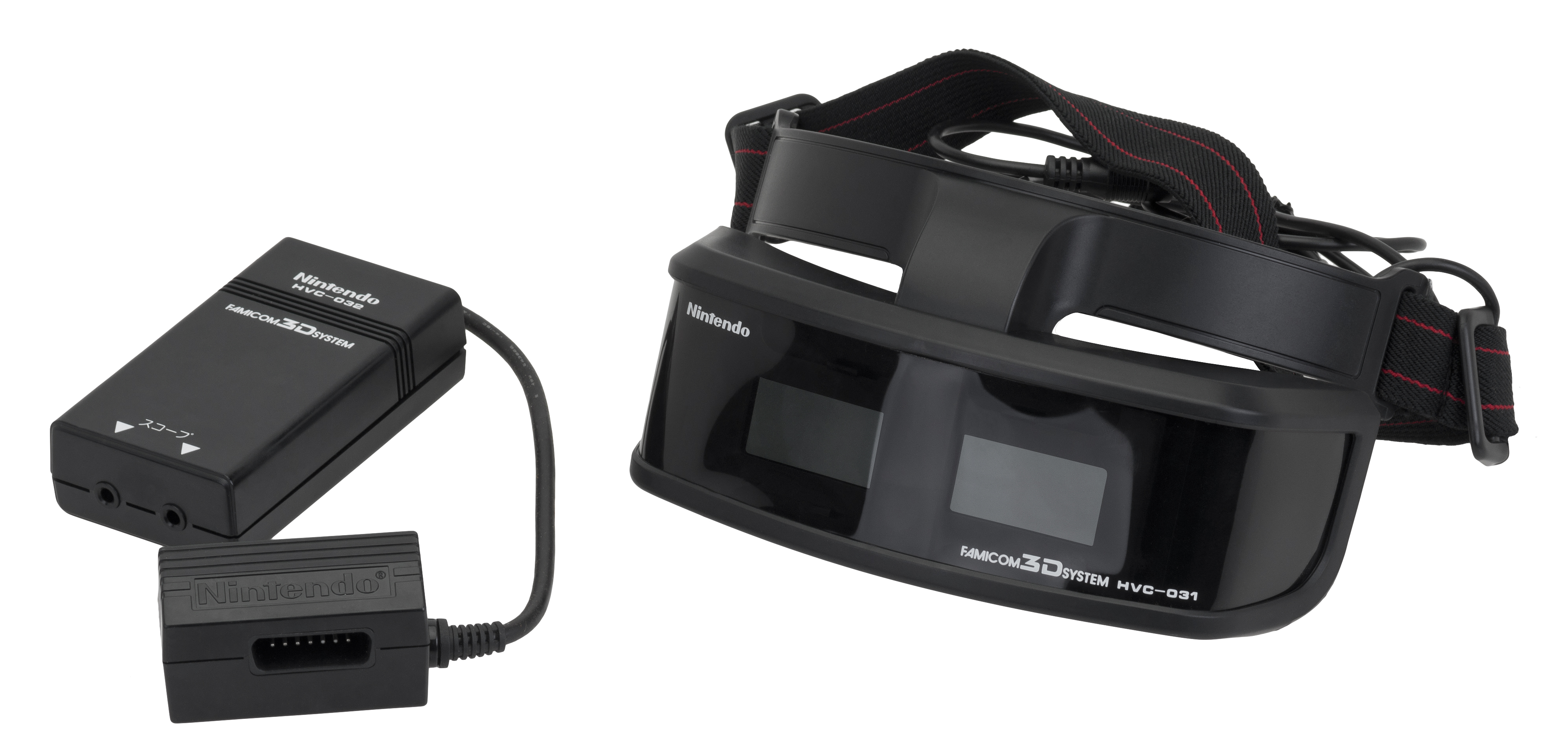
- Manufacturer: Nintendo
- Type: Video game accessory
- Generation: Third generation
- Lifespan: JP: October 21, 1987
- Connectivity: Famicom expansion port 2 3.5 mm jacks (glasses)

The Family Computer 3D System, commonly known as the Famicom 3D System, is a stereoscopic video game accessory produced by Nintendo for its Family Computer (Famicom) console. It was released exclusively in Japan on October 21, 1987, at an MSRP of ¥6,000. The 3D System consists of a pair of active shutter glasses (model HVC-031) and an adapter (model HVC-032) that connects up to two of them via 3.5 mm jacks; the latter connects to the Famicom's expansion port and includes a passthrough port to allow connection of other accessories that use the expansion port. Compatible games would play in conventional 2D until a "3D mode" was activated via a button press or combination, which allowed them to display a stereoscopic image in a similar manner to the SegaScope 3-D glasses for Sega's Master System.

The 3D System was a commercial failure and, as a result, was never released outside Japan. Criticisms included the clunkiness of the glasses and the limited selection of compatible titles. Compatible games that received a release outside Japan were recoded for compatibility with anaglyph 3D glasses instead. Eight years later, in 1995, Nintendo again ventured into stereoscopic gaming with the commercially unsuccessful Virtual Boy. In the following years, Nintendo experimented in stereoscopic 3D with both the GameCube and Game Boy Advance SP systems, but these features were not released commercially due to cost and technical limitations. In 2011, Nintendo released the 3DS handheld capable of displaying stereoscopic 3D images without the need for special glasses. The 3DS has enjoyed a largely positive reception. In 2019 Nintendo released a Labo VR Kit.

== List of compatible games ==
List of compatible games
Title(s)	Platform	Publisher(s)	Release date
Attack Animal Gakuen	Famicom	Pony Canyon	December 26, 1987
Cosmic Epsilon	Famicom	Asmik	November 24, 1989
Falsion	Famicom Disk System	Konami	October 21, 1987
Famicom Grand Prix II: 3D Hot Rally	Famicom Disk System	Nintendo	April 14, 1988
Highway Star (Rad Racer outside Japan)	Famicom	Square	August 7, 1987
JJ: Tobidase Daisakusen Part II	Famicom	Square	December 7, 1987
Fuuun Shourin Ken: Ankoku no Maou	Famicom Disk System	Jaleco	April 22, 1988

== See also ==
- Nintendo 3DS
- SegaScope 3-D
- Virtual Boy
