= List of Nvidia 3D Vision Ready games =

Nvidia 3D Vision is a technology developed by Nvidia, a multinational corporation specializing in developing graphics processing units and chipset technologies for workstations, personal computers, and mobile devices. This technology allows games, movies, and pictures to be displayed in stereoscopic 3D.

To play the following in 3D, as well as convert over 650 existing games, requires Nvidia 3D Vision Glasses with a 120 Hz monitor, or red and cyan glasses with slower monitors, Windows Vista or later, enough system memory (2GB recommended), a compatible CPU (Intel Core 2 Duo or AMD Athlon X2 or higher) and a compatible Nvidia video card (some GeForce 200 series ones or later). Since releasing the technology in 2009, by the end of 2013, only about 40 games appeared certified as "3D Vision Ready", while others have noticeable defects in the 3D image.

== 3D Vision Ready games ==
| Title | Release date | Developer | Publisher | Genre(s) |
|---|---|---|---|---|
| Aion: The Tower of Eternity | 22 September 2009 Actual 3D Vision support added on September 13, 2011 | Aion Team Development Dept | NCsoft | MMORPG |
| Batman: Arkham Asylum | 15 September 2009 | Rocksteady Studios | Eidos Interactive, Warner Bros. Interactive Entertainment/DC Entertainment, Square Enix | Action-adventure |
| Batman: Arkham City | 22 November 2011 | Rocksteady Studios | Warner Bros. Interactive Entertainment/DC Entertainment, Square Enix | Action-adventure |
| Batman: Arkham Origins | 25 October 2013 | WB Games Montréal | Warner Bros. Interactive Entertainment | Action-adventure |
| Battlefield 3 | 25 October 2011 Actual 3D Vision Ready support on November 22, 2011 | EA Digital Illusions CE | Electronic Arts | First-person shooter |
| Battlefield: Bad Company 2 | 2 March 2010 | EA Digital Illusions CE | Electronic Arts | FPS |
| Battlefield: Bad Company 2: Vietnam | 18 December 2010 | EA Digital Illusions CE | Electronic Arts | FPS |
| Brave | 19 June 2012 Actual 3D Vision Ready support added on September 13, 2012 | Behaviour Interactive | Disney Interactive Studios | Adventure |
| Call of Duty: Black Ops | 9 November 2010 | Treyarch | Activision, Square Enix | FPS |
| Carrier Command: Gaea Mission | 1 October 2012 | Bohemia Interactive | Bohemia Interactive | Real-time strategy, Action |
| Civilization V | 22 October 2010 | Firaxis Games | 2K Games | Turn-based strategy, 4X |
| Dead Rising 2 | 29 September 2010 | Blue Castle Games | Capcom | Action RPG |
| Deep Black: Reloaded | 1 March 2012 | Biart | 505 Games | Third-person shooter |
| Depth Hunter | 7 February 2012 Actual 3D Vision Ready support added on September 13, 2012 | Biart | Biart | Simulation |
| Duke Nukem Forever | 10 June 2011 | Gearbox Software | 2K Games | First-person shooter |
| GT Legends | 15 October 2005 | SimBin Studios | 10tacle Studios | Sim racing |
| Hard Reset | 13 September 2011 Actual 3D Vision Ready support added on November 10, 2011 | Flying Wild Hog | Flying Wild Hog | FPS |
| Hawken | 12 December 2012 (open beta) | Adhesive Games | Meteor Entertainment | Vehicular combat First-person shooter Mecha |
| Inversion | 27 July 2012 | Saber Interactive | Namco Bandai Games | Third-person shooter |
| Just Cause 2 | 23 March 2010 | Avalanche Studios; Eidos Interactive | Square Enix | Action, Third-person shooter |
| L.A. Noire | 8 November 2011 Actual 3D Vision Ready support on November 28, 2011 | Rockstar Leeds | Rockstar Games | Third-person shooter, open world |
| Mafia II | 24 August 2010 | 2K Czech | 2K Games | Third-person shooter, action-adventure |
| Medal of Honor (2010) Multi-Player | 12 October 2010 | EA Los Angeles | Electronic Arts | First-person shooter |
| Metro 2033 | 16 March 2010 | 4A Games | THQ | FPS, RPG, Survival horror |
| Oil Rush | 25 January 2012 Actual 3D Vision Ready support added on September 13, 2012 | Unigine Corp | Unigine Corp | Real-time strategy, Tower defense |
| Pirate101 | 8 October 2012 | KingsIsle Entertainment | KingsIsle Entertainment | MMORPG |
| Resident Evil 5 | 16 March 2009 | Capcom | Capcom | Survival horror |
| rFactor 2 | 10 January 2012 | Image Space Incorporated | Image Space Incorporated | Sim racing |
| Roller Coaster Rampage | 19 June 2012 Actual 3D Vision Ready support added on September 13, 2012 | Pantera Entertainment | Pantera Entertainment | Simulation |
| Rusty Hearts | 20 September 2011 | Stairway Games | Perfect World Entertainment | MMORPG |
| Street Fighter X Tekken | 11 May 2012 Actual 3D Vision Ready support added on September 13, 2012 | QLOC | Capcom | Fighting |
| Super Street Fighter IV Arcade Edition | 5 July 2011 | Dimps/Capcom | Capcom | Fighting |
| Tom Clancy's H.A.W.X 2 | 12 November 2010 | Ubisoft Bucharest | Ubisoft | Arcade flight |
| Trine | 3 July 2009 Actual 3D Vision support added on August 4, 2010 | Frozenbyte | Nobilis (worldwide), SouthPeak Games (North American retail) | Platform/Puzzle |
| Trine 2 | 7 December 2011 | Frozenbyte | Frozenbyte | Side-scrolling action platform and puzzle |
| The Witcher 2: Assassins of Kings | 17 May 2011 | CD Projekt Red | Atari, Namco Bandai Games, Warner Bros. Interactive Entertainment | Action RPG, Hack and slash |
| Wizard101 | 2 September 2008 | KingsIsle Entertainment | KingsIsle Entertainment | MMORPG |
| World of Warcraft: Cataclysm | 7 December 2010 | Blizzard Entertainment | Blizzard Entertainment | MMORPG |

== 3D Vision Ready demos ==
| Title | Release date | Developer | Publisher | Genre(s) | Download |
|---|---|---|---|---|---|
| Aliens vs. Triangles | November 9, 2010 | Nvidia | Nvidia | Technology demo | https://www.nvidia.com/object/cool_stuff.html#/demos/2508 |
| Endless City | November 9, 2010 | Nvidia | Nvidia | Technology demo | https://www.nvidia.com/object/cool_stuff.html#/demos/2506 |
| Final Fantasy XIV benchmark | June 15, 2010 | Square Enix | Square Enix | Benchmark | https://www.techpowerup.com/downloads/1818/final-fantasy-xiv-benchmark |
| Passion Leads Army benchmark | May 29, 2012 | Iron Horse Studios | Giant Interactive Group | Benchmark | https://web.archive.org/web/20120926050743/http://www.gamefront.com/files/21766926/StefansMirror_PLA_Benchmark525_zip |
| Stone Giant | August 5, 2010 | BitSquid | BitSquid | Technology demo | http://downloads.guru3d.com/Stone-Giant-Public-Demo-download-2526.html |
| Supersonic Sled | July 3, 2010 | Nvidia | Nvidia | Technology demo | https://www.nvidia.co.uk/object/cool_stuff_uk.html#/demos/2119 |
| Trine 2 | December 7, 2011 | Frozenbyte | Atlus | Technology demo | https://trine2.com/site/ |
| Unigine: Heaven | June 7, 2010 | Unigine Corp | Unigine Corp | Technology demo | http://downloads.guru3d.com/Unigine-Heaven-DirectX-11-benchmark-2.1-download-2549.html |

== Other games ==
In addition to Nvidia's official list of titles, there is an independently developed stereoscopic 3D games database that is put together by end users. Featuring a rules based certification grade and numeric Quality Assurance score, GameGrade3D (GG3D) details required game settings and expected visual anomalies (if any).

== See also ==
- List of 3D PlayStation 3 games
- List of Wii U games
- List of Xbox 360 games with 3D support
- List of stereoscopic video games
- Nvidia 3D Vision
