= IZ3D =

iZ3D Inc
- Industry: Software Industry
- Founded: 1997
- Defunct: 2012
- Headquarters: 4370 La Jolla Village Drive, Suite 400; San Diego, California; United States
- Products: Software; Computer Monitor

iZ3D, Inc., was an American company that developed and sold software which enabled the usage of many different 3D techniques on NVidia and ATI graphic cards, and also sold stereoscopic monitors based on polarization technology.

== History ==
The company was founded in 1997 as a company called NeurOK LLC. In 2001, Neurok Optics formed as a spin-off of NeurOK LLC. In October 2005, Neurok Optics demonstrates their first concept samples of the iZ3D Monitor. In 2006, Neurok Optics released their 17" iZ3D 3D Monitor.

In January 2007, Chi Mei Optoelectronics and Neurok Optics form a 50/50 Joint Venture Company – iZ3D, LLC. Also in January 2007, iZ3D LLC announced the 22" iZ3D 3D Monitor.

In August 2007, iZ3D LLC begins shipping their 22" iZ3D 3D monitor. At this same time, iZ3D shipping their own 3D gaming drivers. In June 2008, iZ3D was selected to join the Microsoft Startup Accelerator Program In July 2008, the 22" iZ3D Monitor expanded into the international retail market and began shipping worldwide.

As of August 31, 2010, the company discontinued the production of their monitor.

As of July 30, 2012, iZ3D discontinued operations entirely. The iZ3D driver was still available for download from its Web site, but only the proprietary iz3D output, ATI 3D DLP and anaglyph outputs were freely available; the other 3D modes (120 Hz 3D Device output, non-ATI 3D DLP, dual output, interleaved, Zalman Output, stereo mirror, VR920 output, side-by-side) were only available as a 30-day trial.

== Branding ==
iZ3D is a play on words, translated to "I see 3D".

== Products ==
iZ3D developed two major products. Before the 22" iZ3D was discontinued, the company developed both the "Dual Panel Polarized" solution, as well as a set of software drivers that would render the game into 3D. Originally, the drivers only supported the company's product, the 22" iZ3D Monitor; however, in December 2008, iZ3D released their drivers for all major 3D outputs.

iZ3D only sold their 3D drivers to end users and OEMs.

== See also ==
- Stereoscopy
- Polarization (waves)
