= Jasper Smith =

British entrepreneur

Jasper Smith (born 1965) is an entrepreneur in the fields of television, interactive media and gaming. He is a director of PlayJam.

== Background ==
Smith has co-founded and developed a number of businesses in the digital media sector including The Fantastic Corporation, Optimistic Entertainment plc (“The Optimistic Network”), and Static2358 / PlayJam. He is an investor or director of several other companies including General Media Ventures, an investment company, and Hutch, a UK based games studio behind popular mobile games such as SmashCops.

=== PlayJam ===
Static 2358 Ltd was a design and branding company set up by Jasper Smith and Mark Rock. The company created visual identities for numerous TV channels including Star TV, Channel 4, Film Four and Canal+, incubated TV networks such as YOYO and PlayJam and formed partnerships with agencies such as Saatchi and Saatchi. PlayJam became the world's largest TV games network before being acquired by Open TV in 2001 for $68 million.

Smith re-acquired PlayJam from Open TV in 2009. The PlayJam Network was distributed to approximately 90 million televisions in over 100 territories by most major manufacturers including; Samsung, LG, Panasonic and Sony. In late 2013 PlayJam launched GameStick, a low cost micro games console. PlayJam is backed by Endeavour Ventures, Gamestop and Adobe.

=== Other companies ===
Smith was a co-founder, and for several years Chairman and CEO of Electra Entertainment Ltd, a technology company focused on creating run time technology and interactive services for digital televisions and set top boxes. Electra won early support from leading retailers such as Tesco and leading manufacturers but ultimately failed to gain sufficient market share. Electra was funded by Jasper Smith, management, government grants and Arthur Hughes, a long term business partner.

He was also a co-founder of The Optimistic Network, a multi channel TV network that operated 7 digital TV channels in the UK and Scandinavia including, Nation-217, QuizNation, SportNation and Bonanza. The company also incubated and developed many TV formats including Jamz and Flipside TV; the early stomping ground for a number of successful TV celebrities such as Richard Bacon, Ian Lee, Alan Carr, Justin Lee Collins and Mary Anne Hobbs. QuizNation was a dedicated quiz TV channel that produced over 24,000 hours of TV shows, some of which were interactive. The channel was ultimately sold.

In 2016 Smith set up two businesses:

- PlayStack, a games publishing and fintech business, in partnership with Harvey Elliott. Smith is the Executive Chairman. PlayStack operates a private equity fund that invests in original content creation and a marketing fund designed to help content creators gain market share.
- Playworks Digital Ltd, a games developer and operator that has created and worked on the development of over 220 games.

Smith initially trained as a sculptor at the Henry Moore Foundation. He first developed a taste for building companies aged 20 when he took over one of his father’s companies and won a contract to build a sales network for Sky TV, selling over 200,000 Sky subscriptions. Smith subsequently worked in senior roles within Norwegian Telecom, The Fantastic Corporation in Zug, Switzerland, a company focused on delivering multimedia content over broadband networks and Video Technology Marketing, the vehicle used to launch VideoPlus in the UK.

In 1987, Smith set up a charity - committed to creating an awareness of the seas - from environmental issues to exploration. In 1989, Smith sailed a 55-foot yacht from Australia to Alaska via the Kamchatka peninsula in Russia, climbing 11 mountains along the way. He is a regular sailor, has 3 children and lives in London. In 2001 Smith was nominated as a finalist for the E&Y Entrepreneur of the Year Award.
