= CloudTV =

Software platform

CloudTV is a software platform that delivers the web-media experience through television.

CloudTV virtualizes CPE or STB functionality, enabling pay-TV operators and other video service providers to bring advanced user interfaces and online video experiences such as YouTube and Hulu to existing and next-generation cable television and IPTV set-top boxes and connected consumer electronics devices. A product of ActiveVideo, a Silicon Valley software company, as of 2014 CloudTV was available on more than 15 million devices. Announced customers included Charter Communications and Cablevision Systems (now part of Optimum Communications) in the United States and Liberty Global in the Americas and Europe. CloudTV-powered services also are available on Philips NetTVs and on Roku players.

== History ==
ActiveVideo was the product of a 2006 merger between ICTV and Switch Media, a developer of technologies for the customization of video streams. The company was named ActiveVideo in 2008. ActiveVideo acquired the European company Avinity Systems, B.V., in 2009.

In 2011, ActiveVideo announced its first consumer electronics partner, Funai Electric, manufacturer of Philips NetTVs. ActiveVideo also has announced a partnership with Sumitomo Corporation, intended to drive distribution of CloudTV in Japan and the Asia-Pacific market. Sumitomo is a 50% owner of J:COM, the largest cable system operator in Japan.

ActiveVideo was acquired by ARRIS Group, Inc. and Charter Communications in 2015 and operates independently as a joint venture of the two parent companies.

== Mission ==
By virtualizing STB functionality, CloudTV enables Web-like guides and full online video experiences on existing and next-generation devices, including QAM STBs and “newer IP-capable devices, such as Charter’s new Worldbox,” Internet-connected TVs and specialized streaming boxes.

Multichannel News notes that “instead of requiring operators to write a different version of the UI for each device, operating system and rendering engine, ActiveVideo’s approach looks to avoid that operational nightmare by requiring that it only be written once and managed from the cloud.” ScreenPlays adds that the platform enables delivery of “protected OTT streams as an integral part of channel offerings” without replacing existing customer devices. The analyst firm nScreenMedia cites advantages as: Compatibility with the widest range of devices; The ability to update an app once and see it reflected on every device; Scalability for large and small service providers; and The ability to use the most advanced UI techniques available to ensure high “coolness” factors. ACG Research notes that for cable operators, CloudTV can reduce total cost of ownership by up to 83% when compared to a set-top box replacement program.

Arpad Jordan, then CTO of Central and Eastern Europe for Liberty Global, described CloudTV's virtualization of STB functionality as a technology “that can always extend the capabilities of any kind of set-top box.” The technology was cited as a key enabler of Charter's 2015 agreement to acquire Time Warner Cable, with Moffett Nathanson analyst Craig Moffett saying “this deal may not have been possible, at least at this price, without ActiveVideo’s technology.”

== Products ==
There are several solutions and products out on the market so far, which use different methodologies for each of them. One of largest subscription that has made by the company Alticast, and ActiveVideo is following it as 2nd reported subscription and running CPEs today. Alticast uses the unique way of the implementation of UI virtualization as using a stream of special "codes" instead of the encoded video stream as other solutions from ActiveVideo or Entrix. Entrix and ActiveVideo have applied their solutions to actual market abroad so far.

ActiveVideo's core CloudTV platform includes two products, both of which bring next-generation user experiences to existing or new STBs or connected devices. These include ActiveVideo CloudTV GuideCast for navigation interfaces and ActiveVideo CloudTV StreamCast to support delivery of online video experiences CloudTV can run on “off-the-shelf blade servers” from vendors such as Dell, HP or Cisco, or on third-party cloud platforms, such as the Amazon Web Service (AWS). On high-density servers from Kontron and others that are based on Intel Quick Sync Video, virtual STB data center CapEx can be as low as $1 per subscriber.

== Cloud-Based UIs ==
The earliest implementations of virtualized STB functionality included the Optimum iO TV Quick Views guide from Cablevision (now part of Optimum Communications), which allows consumers to create up to 20 personalized Uis with up to nine favorite TV channels each, and Olympics UIs that offered simultaneous views of multiple channels of Olympics coverage, plus supplemental Olympic content.

In 2013, Ziggo (now a part of Liberty Global) achieved two pay-TV firsts: delivery of interactive services such as VOD to STBs without built-in hardware, as well as to televisions equipped with CI Plus 1.3 conditional access modules, without the need of a set-top box. The innovation eliminated the need for “extra equipment, extra leads or an extra remote control” and enabled a user experience that would be “exactly the same for all types of peripheral equipment.” In April 2014, Liberty Puerto Rico, a Liberty Global system, announced that it was using CloudTV to power Social Content Navigator, a user interface that uses viewing metrics to rank eight tiles of live video by program popularity. and underscores the value of the channel bundle by encouraging viewers to “go outside their comfort zone.” Videonet noted that Liberty Puerto Rico is running Social Content Navigator on single-tuner set-tops, and observed that such a service ordinarily would require “new STBs with more power and multiple tuners.”

Charter Communications, which in June 2013 had become the first pay-TV provider to commit to deploying a full user interface streamed entirely from the cloud, unveiled its cloud-based Spectrum Guide at the Consumer Electronics Show in January 2015. Videonet noted that because "all set-top boxes on the Charter network" would be able to display the new UI, Charter would be able to avoid choosing between replacing existing devices or limiting the new UI to a "subset of its customer base." Charter CEO Tom Rutledge explained that "the processing power of the box is no longer a relevant issue; the processing power moves to the network. That's a breakthrough. We can take any kind of device and turn it into a sophisticated device." Following the acquisitions of Bright House Networks and Time Warner Cable, Bright House Networks and Time Warner Cable, Charter has restated the company's commitment to roll out the new UI across “legacy Charter markets.”

Other companies that have announced that they have deployed, or intend to deploy, cloud-based UIs include: Glashart Media, a part of Dutch telecommunications provider KPN, that noted that CloudTV has helped it double subscribers and achieve VOD take rates of three items per subscriber per month, and Liberty Global. In addition, Telekom Innovation Laboratories (T-Labs), the research and innovation arm of Deutsche Telekom, has demonstrated how CloudTV allows it to achieve its goal of “virtualizing the set-top box and moving the execution of applications to the cloud.”

== OTT Streaming ==
With the rise of so-called over-the-top (OTT) streaming services, cable system operators have sought to create “friend, not foe” relationships by offering OTT seamlessly as part of the pay-TV service bundle. CloudTV StreamCast enables pay-TV and online video providers to overcome the fragmentation and limitation of device resources, resolving “content experience, content protection and content delivery issues by rendering user interfaces and bridging online and pay-TV DRM and video formats in the cloud.” Light Reading has reported that Charter Communications, for example, could “use their new cloud-based video platform to deliver the OTT service to subscribers.”

In June 2014, GigaOm reported that Liberty Global subsidiary UPC Hungary is “bringing YouTube to every single customer, thanks to clever use of the cloud.” GigaOm noted that UPC is using CloudTV to deliver YouTube to customers’ existing set-top boxes, making the approach “not only cheaper, but also a whole lot faster than transitioning each and every customer to new devices.” The UPC Hungary launch was followed by news that HBO Europe would bring HBO GO to pay-TV STBs using CloudTV StreamCast.

According to Arpad Jordan, then CTO of Central and Eastern Europe for Liberty Global, usage of the YouTube service has exceeded expectations. Within three months of availability, more than a million minutes per day of YouTube content were being streamed to UPC Hungary STBs, with average engagement of 45 minutes per session. After nine months, 68% of subscribers had tried the service and 83% had returned for additional views. Multichannel News reported that Liberty Global could use the same CloudTV StreamCast technology to bring YouTube to its entire footprint of existing set-top boxes.

In April 2016, Cablevision (now owned by Optimum Communications) became “the first MSO to integrate Hulu into its set-tops as a native channel” within its Optimum TV service. Multichannel News reported that using ActiveVideo CloudTV StreamCast, Optimum subscribers could access Hulu on Channel 605 of the interactive program guide on “all current-generation set-top boxes.”

== Advertising ==
At the Consumer Electronics Show in January 2014, ActiveVideo and BrightLine demonstrated the ability to bring interactive brand experiences from American Express and L’Oreal to Roku devices. Light Reading pointed out that in a demonstration at CES, the same L’Oreal ad written in HTML5 provided the same interactive on a Roku box and on a QAM-based cable set-top box.

At The Cable Show in April 2014, Broadcasting & Cable noted that Cablevision was “making notable improvements to its interactive advertising capabilities” using CloudTV. Ben Tatta, president of Cablevision Media Sales, noted that for advertisers, a benefit would be that “any application they have created for web or mobile in HTML5 can be extended to the TV.” American Express became the first advertiser to commit to the platform.
