= Active shutter 3D system =

Method of displaying stereoscopic 3D imagery

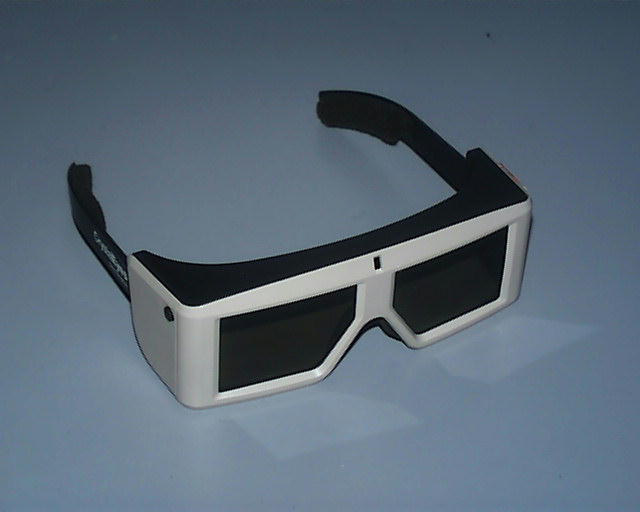
A pair of CrystalEyes shutter glasses

Functional principle of active shutter 3D systems

An active shutter 3D system (a.k.a. alternate frame sequencing, alternate image, AI, alternating field, field sequential or eclipse method) is a technique for displaying stereoscopic 3D images. It works by only presenting the image intended for the left eye while blocking the right eye's view, then presenting the right-eye image while blocking the left eye, and repeating this so rapidly that the interruptions do not interfere with the perceived fusion of the two images into a single 3D image.

Modern active shutter 3D systems generally use liquid crystal shutter glasses (also called "LC shutter glasses" or "active shutter glasses"). Each eye's glass contains a liquid crystal layer which has the property of becoming opaque when voltage is applied, being otherwise transparent. The glasses are controlled by a timing signal that allows the glasses to alternately block one eye, and then the other, in synchronization with the refresh rate of the screen. The timing synchronization to the video equipment may be achieved via a wired signal, or wirelessly by either an infrared or radio frequency (e.g. Bluetooth, DLP link) transmitter. Historic systems also used spinning discs, for example the Teleview system.

Active shutter 3D systems are used to present 3D films in some theaters, and they can be used to present 3D images on CRT, plasma, LCD, projectors and other types of video displays.

== Advantages and disadvantages ==
Although virtually all ordinary unmodified video and computer systems can be used to display 3D by adding a plug-in interface and active shutter glasses, disturbing levels of flicker or ghosting may be apparent with systems or displays not designed for such use. The rate of alternation required to eliminate noticeable flicker depends on image brightness and other factors, but is typically well over 30 image pair cycles per second, the maximum possible with a 60 Hz display. A 120 Hz display, allowing 60 images per second per eye, is widely accepted as flicker-free.

=== Advantages ===
- Unlike red/cyan color filter (anaglyph) 3D glasses, LC shutter glasses are color neutral, enabling 3D viewing in the full-color spectrum, though the ColorCode 3-D anaglyph system does come very close to providing full color resolution.
- Unlike in a Polarized 3D system, where the (usually) horizontal spatial resolution is halved, the active shutter system can retain full resolution (1080p) for both the left and right images. Like any system, manufacturers of televisions may choose not to implement the full resolution for 3D playback but use halved vertical resolution (540p) instead.

=== Disadvantages ===
- Flicker can be noticed except at very high refresh rates, as each eye is effectively receiving only half of the monitor's actual refresh rate. However, modern LC glasses generally work in higher refresh rates and eliminate this problem for most people.
- First, the method only worked with CRT monitors. With widespread availability of 3D TV sets and flat computer screens in the 2010–2013 period, flat-panel monitors support high-enough refresh rates to work with some LC shutter systems. Many projectors, especially DLP-based ones, support 3D out of the box.
- LC shutter glasses are shutting out light half of the time; moreover, they let only 50% of light through when open, because they are polarized. This gives an effect more profound than watching TV with sunglasses on, which causes a picture at only 1/4 brightness to be perceived by the viewer. However, this effect can produce a higher brightness display contrast when paired with LCDs compared to CRTs because the polarisation in the glasses aligns with that of the display, resulting in only a half-brightness image. However, the screen must be in its usual orientation or will appear completely black. Since the glasses also darken the background, contrast is enhanced when using a brighter image.
- When used with LCDs, especially early ones, extreme localized differences between the image to be displayed in one eye and the other may lead to crosstalk, due to LCD panels' pixels sometimes being unable to fully switch, for example from black to white, in the time that separates the left eye's image from the right one. With techniques like overdrive, which addressed the needs of fast video games, advancements in the panel's response time has led to displays that rival or even surpass passive 3D systems.
- Frame rate has to be double that of a non-3D, anaglyph, or polarized 3D systems to get an equivalent result. All equipment in the chain has to be able to process frames at double rate; in essence this doubles the hardware requirements.
- Despite a progressive fall in prices, due to the intrinsic use of electronics, they remain more expensive than anaglyph and polarized 3D glasses.
- Because of their integrated electronics and batteries, early shutter glasses were heavy and expensive. However, design improvements have resulted in newer models that are cheaper, lightweight, rechargeable and able to be worn over prescription lenses.
- From brand to brand, shutter glasses use different synchronization methods and protocols. Therefore, even glasses that use the same kind of synchronization system (e.g. infrared) will probably be incompatible across different makers. Efforts to create a universal 3D shutter glass exist.
- Alternated viewing of left and right views leads to an effect of time parallax, if there are side-moving objects in the scene: they are seen as in front or behind their actual location, according to the move direction.

== Crosstalk ==
Crosstalk is the leakage of frames between left eye and right eye. LCDs have exhibited this problem more often than plasma and DLP displays, due to slower pixel response time. LCDs that utilize a strobe backlight, such as nVidia's LightBoost, reduce crosstalk. This is done by turning off the backlight between refreshes, while waiting for the shutter glasses to switch eyes, and also for the LCD panel to finish pixel transitions.

== Standards ==
The M-3DI Standard was a cross-manufacturer standardization initiative to increase compatibility of LC (Active) Shutter Glasses led by Panasonic in collaboration with XpanD 3D and announced in March 2011. It aimed to increase acceptance of 3D products by consumers by extending the agreement to various manufacturers of 3D TV, computers, notebooks, home projectors, and cinema hardware. As of April 2011, the agreement was joined by Hitachi, Changhong, Funai, Hisense, Mitsubishi Electric, Epson, ViewSonic, and SIM2 Multimedia S.p.A.

In August of the same year, M-3DI was superseded by another agreement, named "Full HD 3D Glasses Initiative", formed between Panasonic, Samsung, Sony, Sharp Corporation, TCL Technology, Toshiba and Philips. The standardization agreement comprised consumer products including televisions, computers and projectors, also based on XpanD 3D's technology. The press release in the announcement said, "Universal glasses with the new IR/RF protocols will be made available in 2012, and are targeted to be backward compatible with 2011 3D active TVs."

Field Sequential has been used in video games, VHS and VHD movies and is often referred to as HQFS for DVDs, these systems use wired or wireless LCS glasses.

The Sensio format was used with DVDs using wireless LCS glasses.

Each different active 3D shutter glasses implementation can operate in their own manufacturer-set frequency to match the refresh rate of the display or projector. Therefore, to achieve compatibility across different brands, certain glasses have been developed to be able to adjust to a broad range of frequencies.

== Timeline ==
The principle made its public debut remarkably early. In 1922, the Teleview 3D system was installed in a single theater in New York City. Several short films and one feature-length film were shown by running left-eye and right-eye prints in a pair of interlocked projectors with their shutters operating out of phase. Each seat in the auditorium was equipped with a viewing device containing a rapidly rotating mechanical shutter synchronized with the projector shutters. The system worked, but the expense of the installation and the unwieldiness of the viewers, which had to be supported on adjustable stands, confined its use to this one engagement.

In recent decades, the availability of lightweight optoelectronic shutters has led to an updated revival of this display method. Liquid crystal shutter glasses were first invented by Stephen McAllister of Evans and Sutherland Computer Corporation in the mid-1970s. The prototype had the LCDs mounted to a small cardboard box using duct tape. The glasses were never commercialized due to ghosting, but E&S was a very early adopter of third-party glasses such as the StereoGraphics CrystalEyes in the mid-1980s.

Panasonic developed a 3D television that employed active-shutter technology in the late 1970s. They unveiled the television in 1981, while at the same time adapting the technology for use with the first stereoscopic video game, Sega's arcade game SubRoc-3D (1982).

In 1985, 3D VHD players became available in Japan from manufacturers such as Victor (JVC), National (Panasonic), and Sharp. Other units were available for field sequential VHS tapes including the Realeyes 3-D. A few kits were made available to watch field sequential DVDs. Sensio released their own format which was higher quality than the High Quality Field Sequential (HQFS) DVDs.

=== Games ===
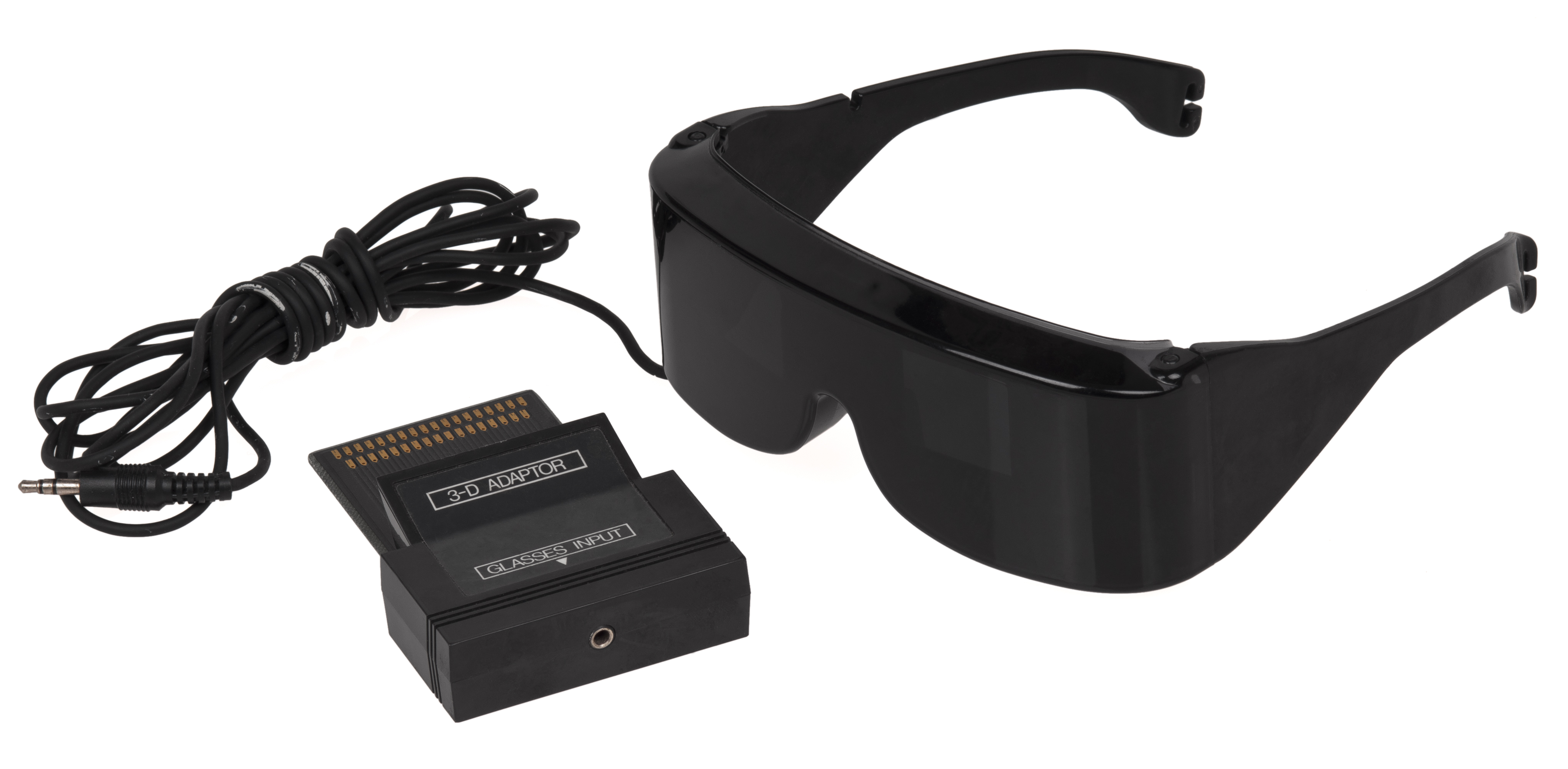
SegaScope 3-D Glasses, released in 1987

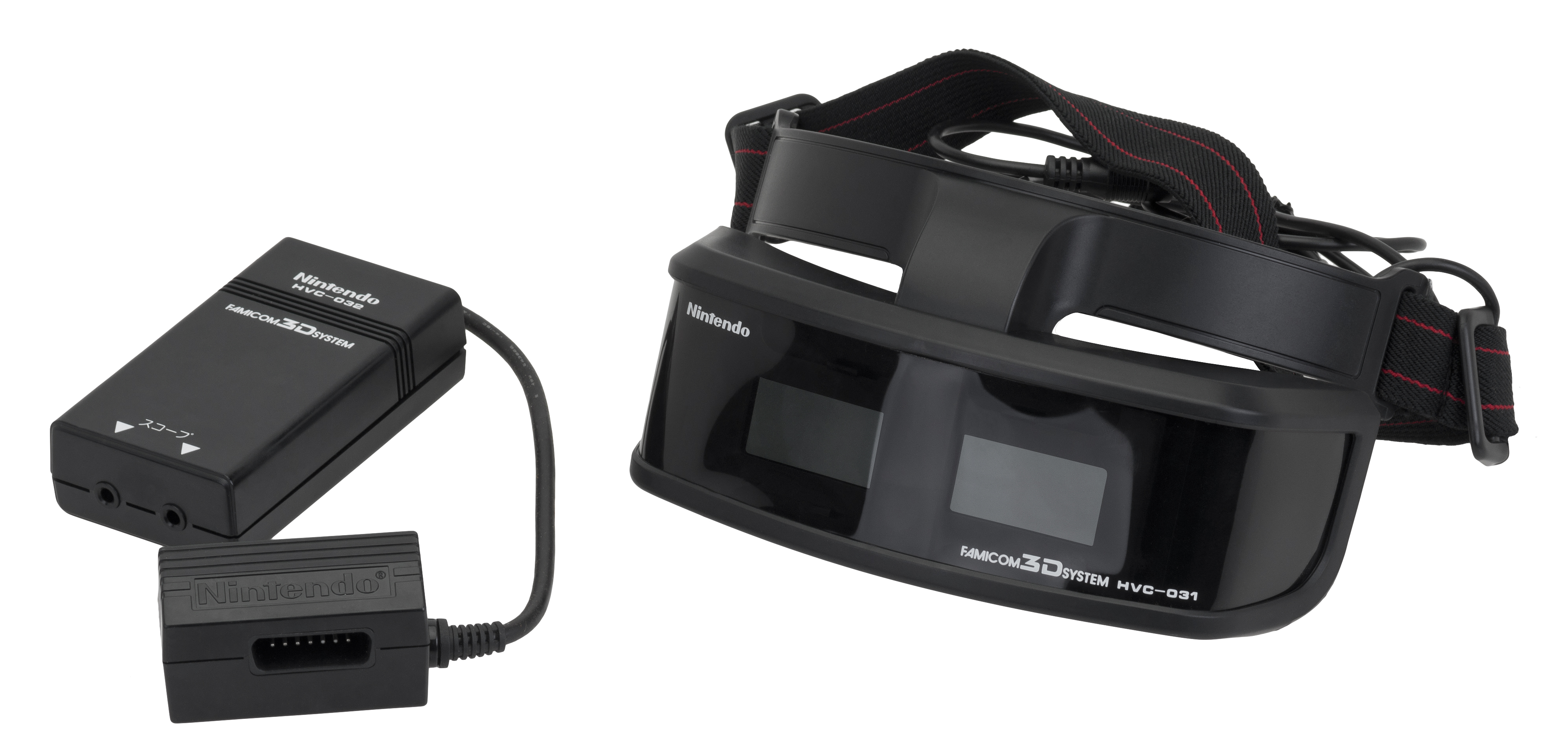
Famicom 3D System, released in 1987 for Japan only

The method of alternating frames can be used to render modern 3-D games into true 3D, although a similar method involving alternate fields has been used to give a 3D illusion on consoles as old as the Master System and Family Computer. Special software or hardware is used to generate two channels of images, offset from each other to create the stereoscopic effect. High frame rates (typically ~100fps) are required to produce seamless graphics, as the perceived frame rate will be half the actual rate (each eye sees only half the total number of frames). Again, LCD shutter glasses synchronized with the graphics chip complete the effect.

In 1982, Sega's arcade video game SubRoc-3D came with a special 3D eyepiece, which was a viewer with spinning discs to alternate left and right images to the player's eye from a single monitor. The game's active shutter 3-D system was developed by Sega with Matsushita (now Panasonic).

In 1984, Milton Bradley released the 3-D Imager, a primitive form of active shutter glasses that used a motorized rotating disc with transparencies as physical shutters, for the Vectrex. Although bulky and crude, they used the same basic principle of rapidly alternating imagery that modern active shutter glasses still use.

Nintendo released the Famicom 3D System for the Famicom in October 1987 in Japan, which was an LCD shutter headset, the first home video game electronic device to use LCD Active Shutter glasses. Sega released the SegaScope 3-D for the Master System Worldwide in November 1987. Only eight 3D compatible games were ever released.

In 1993, Pioneer released the LaserActive system which had a bay for various "PAC's" such as the Mega LD PAC and LD-ROM² PAC. The unit was 3D capable with the addition of the LaserActive 3-D goggles (GOL-1) and the adapter (ADP-1).

While the 3D hardware for these earlier video game systems is almost entirely in the hands of collectors it is still possible to play the games in 3D using emulators, for example, using a Sega Dreamcast with a Sega Master System emulator in conjunction with a CRT television and a 3D system like the one found in The Ultimate 3-D Collection.

In 1999–2000, a number of companies created stereoscopic LC shutter glasses kits for the Windows PCs which worked with application and games written for Direct3D and OpenGL 3D graphics APIs. These kits only worked with CRT computer displays and employed either VGA pass-through, VESA Stereo or proprietary interface for left–right synchronization.

The most prominent example was the ELSA Revelator glasses, which worked exclusively with Nvidia cards through a proprietary interface based on VESA Stereo. Nvidia later bought the technology and used it in its stereo driver for Windows.

The glasses kits came with driver software which intercepted API calls and effectively rendering the two views in sequence; this technique required twice the performance from the graphic card, so a high-end device was needed. Visual glitches were common, as many 3D game engines relied on 2-D effects which were rendered at the incorrect depth, causing disorientation for the viewer. Very few CRT displays were able to support a 120 Hz refresh rate at common gaming resolutions of the time, so high-end CRT display was required for a flicker-free image; and even with a capable CRT monitor, many users reported flickering and headaches.

These CRT kits were entirely incompatible with common LCD monitors which had low 60 Hz or 75 Hz refresh rates, unlike CRT displays that had a higher refresh rate at lower resolutions. Moreover, the display market swiftly shifted to LCD monitors and most display makers ceased production of CRT monitors in early 2000s, which meant that PC glasses kits shortly fell into disuse and were reduced to a very niche market, requiring a purchase of a used high-end, big diagonal CRT monitor.

SplitFish EyeFX 3-D was a stereoscopic 3D shutter glasses kit for the Sony PlayStation 2 released in 2005; it only supported standard-definition CRT TVs. The accessory included a pass-through cable for the PS2 gamepad; when activated, the attached accessory would issue a sequence of rapidly alternating left–right movement commands to the console, producing a kind of "wiggle stereoscopy" effect additionally aided by the wired LC shutter glasses which worked in sync with these movements. The kit arrived too late in the product cycle of the console when it was effectively replaced by the PlayStation 3, and only a few games were supported, so it was largely ignored by gamers.

The USB-based Nvidia 3D Vision kit released in 2008 supports CRT monitors capable of 100, 110, or 120 Hz refresh rates, as well as 120 Hz LCD monitors.

== Hardware ==
=== Active shutter 3D system providers ===
There are many sources of low-cost 3D glasses. IO glasses are the most common glasses in this category. XpanD 3D is a manufacturer of shutter glasses, with over 1000 theaters having used XpanD glasses. With the release of this technology to the home-viewer market as of 2009, many other manufacturers are now developing their own LC shutter glasses, such as Unipolar International Limited, Accupix Co., Ltd, Panasonic, Samsung, and Sony.

The M-3DI Standard, announced by Panasonic Corporation together with XPAND 3D in March 2011, aims to provide industry-wide compatibility and standardization of LC (Active) Shutter Glasses.

Samsung has developed active 3D glasses that are 2 ounces (57 g) and utilize lens and frame technology pioneered by Silhouette, who creates glasses for NASA.

Nvidia makes a 3D Vision kit for the PC; it comes with 3D shutter glasses, a transmitter, and special graphics driver software. While regular LCD monitors run at 60 Hz, a 120 Hz monitor is required to use 3D Vision.

Other providers of active 3D glasses include EStar America and Optoma. Both companies produce 3D Glasses compatible with a variety of technologies, including RF, DLP Link and Bluetooth.

=== DLP 3D ===
In 2007, Texas Instruments introduced stereoscopic-3D capable Digital Light Processing (DLP) solutions to its OEMs, Samsung and Mitsubishi then introduced the first two-view-3D ready DLP televisions, and DLP 3D projectors came later. These solutions utilize the inherent speed advantage of the Digital Micro-mirror Device (DMD) to sequentially generate a high refresh rate for the left and right views required for stereoscopic projection.

DLP 3D technology uses the SmoothPicture wobulation algorithm and relies on the properties of modern 1080p60 DMD imagers. It effectively compacts two left/right views into a single frame by using a checkerboard pattern, only requiring a standard 1080p60 resolution for stereoscopic transmission to the TV. The claimed advantage of this solution is increased spatial resolution, unlike other methods which cut vertical or horizontal resolution in half.

The micromirrors are organized in a so-called "offset-diamond pixel layout" of 960×1080 micromirrors, rotated 45 degrees, with their center points placed in the center of "black" squares on the checkerboard. The DMD employs full-pixel wobulation to display the complete 1080p image as two half-resolution images in a fast sequence. The DMD operates at twice the refresh rate, i.e. 120 Hz, and the complete 1080p picture is displayed in two steps. On the first cadence, only half of the original 1080p60 image is displayed – the pixels that correspond to the "black" squares of the checkerboard pattern. On the second cadence, the DMD array is mechanically shifted ("wobulated") by one pixel, so the micromirrors are now in a position previously occupied by the gaps, and another half of the image is displayed – this time, the pixels that correspond to the "white" squares.

A synchronization signal is then generated to synchronize the screen's refresh with LC shutter glasses worn by the viewer, using Texas Instruments' proprietary mechanism called DLP Link. DLP Link keeps sync by embedding briefly-flashed white frames during the display's blanking interval, which are picked up by the LC shutter glasses.

=== Plasma TV ===
Plasma display panels are inherently high-speed devices as well, since they use pulse-width modulation to maintain the brightness of individual pixels, making them compatible with sequential method involving shutter glasses. Modern panels feature pixel driving frequency of up to 600 Hz and allow 10-bit to 12-bit color precision with 1024 to 4096 gradations of brightness for each subpixel.

Samsung Electronics launched 3D-ready PDP TVs in 2008, a "PAVV Cannes 450" in Korea and PNAx450 in the UK and the US. The sets utilize the same checkerboard pattern compression scheme as their DLP TVs, though only at the native resolution of 1360×768 pixels and not at HDTV standard 720p, making them only usable with a PC.

Matsushita Electric (Panasonic) prototyped the "3-D Full-HD Plasma Theater System" on CES 2008. The system is a combination of a 103-inch PDP TV, a Blu-ray Disc player and shutter glasses. The new system transmits 1080i60 interlaced images for both right and left eyes, and the video is stored on a 50-gigabyte Blu-ray using the MPEG-4 AVC/H.264 compression Multiview Video Coding extension.

=== LCD ===
Formerly, LCDs were not very suitable for stereoscopic 3D due to slow pixel response time. Liquid crystal displays have traditionally been slow to change from one polarization state to another. Users of early 1990s laptops are familiar with the smearing and blurring that occurs when something moves too fast for the LCD to keep up.

LCD technology is not usually rated by frames per second but rather the time it takes to transition from one pixel color value to another pixel color value. Normally, a 120 Hz refresh is displayed for a full 1/120 second (8.33 milliseconds) due to sample-and-hold, regardless of how quickly an LCD can complete pixel transitions. Recently, it became possible to hide pixel transitions from being seen, using strobe backlight technology, by turning off the backlight between refreshes, to reduce crosstalk. Newer LCD televisions, including high-end Sony and Samsung 3D TVs, now utilize a strobed backlight or scanning backlight to reduce 3D crosstalk during shutter glasses operation.

== Therapeutic alternating occlusion ==
In vision therapy of amblyopia and of intermittent central suppression, liquid crystal devices have been used for purposes of enhanced occlusion therapy. In this scenario, the amblyopic patient wears electronically programmable liquid crystal glasses or goggles continuously for several hours during regular everyday activities. Wearing the device encourages or forces the patient to use both eyes alternatingly, similar to eye patching, but rapidly alternating in time. The aim is to circumvent the patient's tendency to suppress the field of view of the weaker eye and to train the patient's capacity for binocular vision. The goggles mostly feature a much slower flicker rate than the more well-known active shutter 3D glasses.

== See also ==
- Digital 3D
- Teleview
- LED TV
- CrystalEyes
