= Nvidia 3D Vision =

Discontinued stereoscopic gaming kit by Nvidia

Nvidia 3D Vision (previously GeForce 3D Vision) is a discontinued stereoscopic gaming kit from Nvidia which consists of LC shutter glasses and driver software which enables stereoscopic vision for any Direct3D game, with various degrees of compatibility. There have been many examples of shutter glasses. Electrically controlled mechanical shutter glasses date back to the middle of the 20th century. LCD shutter glasses appeared in the 1980s, one example of which is Sega's SegaScope. This was available for Sega's game console, the Master System. The NVIDIA 3D Vision gaming kit introduced in 2008 made this technology available for mainstream consumers and PC gamers.

The kit is specially designed for 120 Hz LCD monitors, but is also compatible with CRT monitors (some of which may work at 1024×768×120 Hz and even higher refresh rates), DLP-projectors, 3LCD projectors and others. It requires a compatible graphics card from Nvidia (GeForce 200 series or later).

== Shutter glasses ==
The glasses use wireless IR protocol and can be charged from a USB cable, allowing around 60 hours of continuous use.

The wireless emitter connects to the USB port and interfaces with the underlying driver software. It also contains a VESA Stereo port for connecting supported DLP TV sets, although standalone operation without a PC with installed Nvidia 3D Vision driver is not allowed.

Nvidia includes one pair of shutter glasses in their 3D Vision kit, SKU 942-10701-0003. Each lens operates at 60 Hz, and alternate to create a 120 Hz 3-dimensional experience.

== Stereo driver ==
The stereo driver software can perform automatic stereoscopic conversion by using the 3D models submitted by the application and rendering two stereoscopic views instead of the standard mono view. The automatic driver works in two modes: fully "automatic" mode, where 3D Vision driver controls Stereo Convergence (Pop Out) and Stereo Separation (Screen Depth), and "explicit" mode, where control over screen depth, separation, and textures is performed by the game developer with the use of proprietary NVAPI.

The quad-buffered mode allows developers to control the rendering, avoiding the automatic mode of the driver and just presenting the rendered stereo picture to left and right frame buffers with associated back buffers.

=== History ===
The roots of the Nvidia stereo driver can be traced to the software supplied with the wired ELSA Revelator shutter glasses from 1990s. Nvidia has acquired the technology and has provided support for various stereoscopic display technologies, including stereoscopic shutter glasses, with their own version driver which only worked with Nvidia graphics cards.

In 2008, Nvidia undertook major rewrite of the driver which was converted to use Windows Display Driver Model, making it only compatible with Windows Vista and Nvidia's glasses. The stereo driver was renamed as 3D Vision driver.

=== Discontinuation of support ===
On April 11, 2019, Nvidia announced that support for 3D Vision in drivers would be discontinued, as well as support for 3DTV. Driver releases after version 425.31 do not include support for 3D Vision.

== See also ==
- List of Nvidia 3D Vision Ready games
- AMD HD3D
