= Digital 3D =

Animation presentation technology

Digital 3D is a non-specific 3D standard in which films, television shows, and video games are presented and shot in digital 3D technology or later processed in digital post-production to add a 3D effect.

One of the first studios to use digital 3D was Walt Disney Pictures. In promoting their first CGI-animated film Chicken Little, they trademarked the phrase Disney Digital 3-D and collaborated with RealD Inc. to present the film in 3D in the United States. A total of over 62 theaters in the US were retrofitted to use the RealD 3D system. The 2008 animated feature Bolt was the first movie that was animated and rendered for digital 3D, whereas Chicken Little had been converted after it was finished. Even though some critics and fans were skeptical about digital 3D, it has gained in popularity. Now there are several competing digital 3D formats including Dolby 3D, XpanD 3D, Panavision 3D, MasterImage 3D and IMAX 3D. The first home video game console to be capable of 3D was the Master System in which a limited number of titles were capable of delivering 3D.

== History ==
A first wave of 3D film production began in 1952 with the release of Bwana Devil and continued until 1955, a period known as the golden era of 3D film. Polarized 3D glasses were used. It was among several gimmicks used by movie studios (such as Cinerama and Cinemascope) to compete with television. A further brief period of 3D movie production occurred in the early 1980s.

After announcing that Home on the Range would be their final hand-drawn feature and in fear that Pixar would not re-sign for a new distribution deal, Disney went to work on Chicken Little. The RealD company suggested that Disney use their 3D system and after looking at test footage Disney decided to proceed. In 2005, Chicken Little was a success at the box office in both 2D and 3D screenings. Two more films followed in their classic feature animation - Meet the Robinsons and Bolt - along with several others. Since then many film studios have shot and released films in several digital 3D formats. In 2010, Avatar became the first feature film shot in digital 3D to win the Academy Award for Best Cinematography and was also the first feature film shot using 3D technology nominated for Best Picture.

== Live-action ==
The standard for shooting live-action films in 3D involves using two cameras mounted so that their lenses are about as far apart from each other as the average pair of human eyes, recording two separate images for both the left eye and the right eye. In principle, two normal 2D cameras could be put side-to-side but this is problematic in many ways. The only real option is to invest in new stereoscopic 3D cameras. Moreover, some cinematographic tricks that are simple with a 2D camera become impossible when filming in 3D. This means those otherwise cheap tricks need to be replaced by expensive CGI. for example Oz the Great and Powerful.

In 2008, Journey to the Center of the Earth became the first live-action feature film to be shot with the new Fusion Camera System released in Digital 3D. This film was later followed with several other films shot in live-action. The 2009 release of Avatar was shot in a 3D process that is based on how the human eye looks at an image. It was an improvement to a currently existing 3D camera system. Many 3D camera rigs still in use simply pair two cameras side by side, while newer rigs are paired with a beam splitter or both camera lens built into one unit. Digital Cinema cameras are not really required for 3D but are the predominant medium 99% of what is photographed. Film options include IMAX 3D and Cine 160.

== Animation ==
Animated films can be rendered as a stereoscopic 3D version by using two virtual cameras. Because the entire movie is basically a 3D model, it only takes twice the rendering time and a little effort to properly set up stereoscopic views.

In 2005, Walt Disney Pictures released the first animated digital 3D feature film, Chicken Little. Monsters vs. Aliens (2009) used a new digital rendering process called InTru3D, developed by Intel to create more realistic animated 3D images.

== Video games ==
In June 1986, Sega released the Master System, part of the third generation of gaming consoles. The system had a card slot that provided power to a single pair of LCD shutter glasses, allowing certain games to be viewed in 3D; however, only 8 3D-compatible games were ever released, and when the system was redesigned in 1990 in order to cut down on manufacturing costs, it lost the ability to support 3D. It was the first known electronic device released in North America to use LCD shutter glasses.

In July 1995, Nintendo released the Virtual Boy, built around a 3D viewer held closely to users' eyes, acting like a pair of goggles. Both left and right eye images were red, and put strain on players' eyes; the system was a failure and was discontinued the following year. In December 2008, several third-party developers for the PlayStation 3 announced they would work toward bringing Stereoscopic 3D gaming to major gaming consoles using their own technology. In the coming months, both the Xbox 360 and the PlayStation 3 will be capable of 3D imaging via 3D TV and system/hardware updates. On June 15, 2010, at the E3 Expo, Nintendo unveiled the Nintendo 3DS, the successor to the Nintendo DS series of handheld consoles. It is the first gaming console to allow 3D viewing without the need for 3D glasses or an equivalent.

== Home media ==
=== Television ===
When the unexpected 3D box office success of Avatar — combined with a record twenty 3D films released in 2009 — produced a presumption among TV manufacturers of heavy consumer demand for 3D television, research and development increased accordingly.

Samsung launched the first 3D TV in February 2010, with the release — via selected retailers — of a 3D starter kit that comprised a Samsung branded 3D-capable High Definition player and television, with two pairs of its 3D glasses, an exclusive 3D edition of Monsters vs. Aliens, along with a discount on the purchase of three other 3D movies. In June 2010, Panasonic announced Coraline and Ice Age: Dawn of the Dinosaurs as bonus 3D titles with the purchase of any of its 3D TVs. On June 22, 2010, Cloudy with a Chance of Meatballs became the first 3D title to be released without any requirement to buy any new electronic hardware, while a free Blu-ray of this Sony title would be included in any of its 3D entertainment packages.

Specifications for 3D included the HDMI 1.4a standards. Some 3D TVs produced simulated 3D effects from standard 2D input, but its effectiveness is limited in the matter of depth.

Each of the TV manufacturers would design its own 3D glasses in accordance with its own 3D television technology. Although the only option available in 2010 was active shutter technology, TV manufacturers (notably LG and Vizio) in mid to late 2011 would offer passive circular polarized glasses, while Sony announced a 3D technology ostensibly requiring no 3D glasses at all. In 2015, Samsung unveiled an 8K HDR display with glasses-free 3D — then the largest and highest resolution 3D TV of all.

=== Home video ===
Several DVD and Blu-ray releases have already tried their hands at releasing the 3D versions of films by using an anaglyph format. One noted release prior to the advent of digital cinema is the 1982 film Friday the 13th: Part 3 in 3D, but other such films actually shot digitally like Coraline were released on DVD and Blu-ray. Both included 2D and 3D versions and both were packaged with pairs of 3D glasses. The Blu-ray Disc Association ordered a new standard for presenting 3D content on Blu-ray that would also be backwards compatible with all 2D displays. In December 2009, it was announced that they had adopted the Multiview Video Codec (MVC), which would be playable in all Blu-ray disc players even if they could not generate a 3D image. The codec contains information that is readable on a 2D output plus additional information that can only be read on a 3D output and display. A future extension for 4K Blu-ray 3D is currently in development for the HEVC codec.

=== Broadcasting ===
In 2008, the BBC broadcast the world's first live-action sporting event in 3D, transmitting an England vs. Scotland rugby match to a London theater. On April 3, 2010, Sky TV broadcast a Chelsea vs. Manchester United match to around 1,000 pubs in the UK ESPN 3D launched on June 11, 2010. On July 1, 2010, N3D became the world's first 24-hour 3D channel. 25 matches of in the 2010 FIFA World Cup soccer tournament were broadcast in 3D.

== See also ==
- 2D to 3D conversion
- 2D-plus-Depth
- 3D film
- List of 3D films
- List of 3D video games
- MasterImage 3D
- Panavision 3D
- RealD 3D by RealD Inc.
