= Sam Allen (actor) =

American actor

- Publicity Photo of Sam Allen
- Born: December 25, 1861; Baltimore, Maryland, United States
- Died: September 13, 1934 (aged 72); Los Angeles, California, United States
- Occupation: Actor

Sam Allen (December 25, 1861 – September 13, 1934) was an American actor known for his role as Uncle Hughey in The Virginian (1923). He founded a brewery and a hotel complex.

In 1910 he left the stage and joined as an actor on the silver screen. Between 1921 and 1930 he appeared in 18 features: The Conflict (1921) with Priscilla Dean and Herbert Rawlinson, The Son of the Wolf (1922) with Wheeler Oakman and Edith Roberts, Are you a Failure (1923) with Madge Bellamy and Lloyd Hughes, the western The Virginian with Kenneth Harlan and Florence Vidor, the comedy Bashful Buccaneer (1925) with Reed Howes and Dorothy Dwan, Timber Wolf with Buck Jones and Elinor Fair, The Call of the Klondike (1926) with Gaston Glass and Wanda Hawley, The Sea Beast with John Barrymore and Dolores Costello, Black Jack (1927) with Buck Jones and Barbara Bennett, Death Valley (1927) with Carroll Nye and Roda Rae, Woman's Law with Pat O'Malley and Lillian Rich, Burning Bridges (1928) with Harry Carey and Kathleen Collins, and The Sea Wolf (1930) with Milton Sills.

== Filmography ==
- Jerry's Jam (1917, Short) as Father
- Conflict (1921) as Orrin Lakin
- The Son of the Wolf (1922) as Father Roubeau
- Forget Me Not (1922)
- Confidence (1922) as Const. Kittering
- Are You a Failure? (1923) as Thaddeus Crane
- The Virginian as Uncle Hughie
- The Reel Virginian (1924, Short) as Uncle Louie Lorimer
- The Power God (1925) as John Morgan
- The Gold Rush (1925) as Man in Dance Hall (uncredited)
- The Timber Wolf (1925) as Joe Terry
- Bashful Buccaneer (1925) as Captain
- The Perfect Clown (1925) (uncredited)
- Man Rustlin' (1926) as Pop Geers
- The Sea Beast (1926) as Captain
- The Midnight Limited (1926) as Sam Foster
- The Call of the Klondike (1926) as Burt Kenney
- Dog Scents (1926, Short) as Jasper Jones
- Mother (1927) as Cpl. Cotter
- Woman's Law (1927) as Jules La Pierre
- Death Valley (1927) as Her Father
- Black Jack (1927) as Ed Holbrook
- Burning Bridges (1928) as Dr. Zach McCarthy
- The Sea Wolf (1930) as Neilson
- The Cowboy Counsellor (1932) as Hotel Clerk
- The Last Round-Up (1934) as First Miner (final film role)
