= Goodrich Quality Theaters =

American movie theater chain

Goodrich Theater NewCo, LLC (GQT Movies)
- Movies. Munchies. Memories.
- Type: Private
- Industry: Movie theaters
- Founded: Grand Rapids, Michigan (1930)
- Founder: William Goodrich
- Headquarters: Lafayette, Indiana
- Area served: Michigan, Indiana, Illinois, Missouri, Alabama, and Pennsylvania
- Owner: Mason Asset Management Mark McSparin (President)
- Number of employees: 1001-5000
- Website: https://www.gqtmovies.com

Goodrich Theater NewCo, LLC. (GQT Movies, formerly GQTI) is an American chain of 22 movie theaters, headquartered in Grand Rapids, MI, representing a total of 174 screens in the United States. The majority of GQT Movies' locations are in Michigan, but other locations could be found in Illinois, Indiana, Missouri, Alabama, and Pennsylvania. The company filed for Chapter 11 Bankruptcy protection in February 2020. All employees were terminated March 19, 2020 without notice largely due to the COVID-19 pandemic, as many movie theaters were closed by government order in many states. In last July 2020, the company began reopening some of their locations. By the end of the year it had reopened its 22 locations. As of 2026, GQT is based in Lafayette, Indiana.

The first IMAX screens operated by Goodrich Quality Theaters were unveiled in early 2007. After undergoing renovations, Randall 15 IMAX in Batavia, Illinois featured an IMAX screen, as does Portage 16 IMAX in Portage, Indiana.

Opening in March 2008, Hamilton 16 IMAX + GDX in Noblesville, Indiana was the third GQT location with an IMAX while adding two Giant Digital Experience (GDX) auditoriums in 2016 featuring Dolby Atmos sound. Savoy 16 near Champaign, Illinois underwent renovations and opened an IMAX auditorium on May 3, 2013, to make the fourth IMAX location for Goodrich Quality Theaters.

All of GQT's screens were converted to digital in the Fall of 2011. Every GQT location featured one or more screens equipped with 3D technology, either in RealD 3D or MasterImage 3D.

At the same time, GQT had stepped into the restaurant industry with Features Gastropub in Gibsonton, Florida, a suburb of Tampa.

Bob Goodrich, was the owner and president of Goodrich Quality Theaters, also owns and operates WPRR AM and FM in Grand Rapids.

On February 28, 2020, Goodrich Quality Theaters filed for Chapter 11 bankruptcy.

In July 2020, Mason Asset Management, Namdar Realty, and VIP Cinemas purchased Goodrich Quality Theaters under the name Goodrich Theater Newco. It was formed in Delaware on July 1, 2020. On July 7, 2020, documents were filed with the Missouri Secretary of State to operate the two Missouri Goodrich theaters as Goodrich Theater Propco LLC - Forum 8 and Goodrich Theater Propco LLC - Capital 8, creating an LLC for each theater location. Creating a LLC for each location is becoming a common scenario to prevent loss in that if one theater location goes bankrupt then it will not cause the entire chain to go bankrupt. The purpose of creating the LLCs were to Operate a movie theater and the Secretary of State documents were electronically signed by Igal Namdar.

== History ==
The origins of Goodrich Quality Theaters can be traced back to 1930, when William Goodrich left his family's rubber manufacturing business in order to purchase the Savoy Theatre in downtown Grand Rapids, Michigan. Previously, the Savoy Theatre had been a vaudeville theater; Goodrich renovated it as a single-screen movie theater and opened it in 1931 with "All Quiet on the Western Front". Business at the theater prospered, largely due to Goodrich's cheap double features. For just 15 cents, patrons could watch the main feature, followed by a B-Movie. By comparison, the average price for a movie ticket nationwide hovered between 23 and 25 cents during the 1930s. The theater was still able to make money from food and beverage concessions.

The Savoy was later converted into a two-screen theater and finally shut down in 1979. William Goodrich also operated the Majestic Theatre in Grand Rapids, which was later sold and currently exists as the Meijer Majestic Theatre, owned by the Grand Rapids Civic Theatre.

Control of the company was handed down to William's son, Bob Goodrich, who still heads Goodrich Quality Theaters. Bob Goodrich extensively expanded the company, founding new multiplexes and drive-ins around Michigan. Some of the "original" multiplex theaters are still in operation today. Many have since been expanded, and all have undergone technological renovations (such as the addition of digital sound, digital projection, and recliner seating).

Bob Goodrich eventually began building his business outside Michigan, establishing theaters in nearby states. Over the last decade, the chain has focused on renovating older theaters with modern amenities, as well as continuing to build and plan brand new multiplexes beyond the Midwest.

In February 2020, Goodrich Quality Theaters declared bankruptcy and in July 2020 it was sold off to a few different companies with Mason Asset Management and Mark McSparin getting the bulk number of theaters (22).

== Theaters ==
GQT theaters are primarily located in small towns and mid-sized cities. All locations are multiplex theaters, ranging from 4-to-16 screens and offer multiple formats and experiences across the board.

The standard GQT location featured classic designs of the late 1990s, largely due to acquiring locally owned theaters from private exhibitors. Newer theaters or remodeled theaters break with this tradition by incorporating vibrant colors with a modern design.

An increasing variety of food options were being sold at GQT concession stands, offering more concessions over traditional movie theater snacks. Typical concession items included popcorn, soda, candy, nachos, pretzels, hot dogs, and slushies. Some larger multiplexes began offering personal pan pizzas, chicken fingers, and mozzarella sticks.

Screen taps is a belly-up bar or bar behind a concession stand giving adult moviegoers aged 21 or over an alternative to the traditional beverages offered at the theater concession stand. Offering select local and regional craft beers on draft, plus a variety of domestic bottle choices. In addition, Screen Taps have a house red or white wine. Select locations also serve margaritas and daiquiris. Screen Taps is available at Bay City 10 GDX (Bay City), Brownsburg 8 GDX (Brownsburg), Eastside 10 IMAX (Lafayette), Jackson 10 (Jackson), Kalamazoo 10 (Kalamazoo), Krafft 8 (Port Huron), and West Columbia 7 (Battle Creek). Patrons are required to present their ticket stub, show a valid I.D., and drink responsibly. No alcoholic beverages are served during G or PG features before 8:00 P.M. at all Screen Taps locations.

GQT offers incentives for repeat visits, such as GQT Rewards that allows a customer to redeem free concession items after earning a certain number of points from ticket and concession purchases. This program also offers free birthday and anniversary popcorns.

== Premium formats ==
GQT offers a few premium formats at their locations, while all locations are equipped to show 3D films in RealD 3D in select auditoriums.

=== IMAX ===
IMAX screens and projectors are being installed at larger theatre complexes. The only GQT IMAX theaters is located Eastside 10 IMAX.

== Employees ==
Goodrich cast members are all part-time and primarily consist of high school and college students. Cast members perform duties such as operating cash registers and cleaning theaters between shows.

Theater managers typically start out as staffers rather than directly hired in as managers. Regional Managers are responsible for all theaters in their designated area. GQT Movies has two regional offices. Regional Managers report to the GQT headquarters in Grand Rapids.

=== Dismissal of underaged employees ===
As of 2019 there have been reports that the theater chain is laying off all employees under the age of 18. According to staff members, the main reason behind the layoffs is because there is a negative connotation linked to teenagers and not solely due to their performance. As of January 1, 2020, all 16 year olds employed by the company were let go, and there were still plans to lay off all 17 year olds effective July 2020; these plans were announced before the COVID-19 pandemic took hold in the United States. Since the new ownership took over in July 2020, they have rehired 16 and 17 year olds and no longer have this policy.

== Noovie ==
A pre-show plays on all screens before performances, dubbed the Noovie, is produced by National CineMedia (NCM). The Noovie features advertisements for local establishments, nationwide ad campaigns (including movie trailers), and content created for or by GQT. The show generally runs between 15 and 25 minutes and is timed to end exactly when the movie is scheduled to begin. NCM also handles the advertising content played on flat-screen TVs located in the lobbies of GQT locations.

== R-Rated Film Policy ==
GQT follows the guidelines of the MPAA's film ratings system, which state that no person under age 17 should be admitted into an R-rated film without a parent or guardian aged 21 or older.

== See also ==
- List of movie theaters and cinema chains
