= RealD 3D =

Digital stereoscopic 3D projection technology

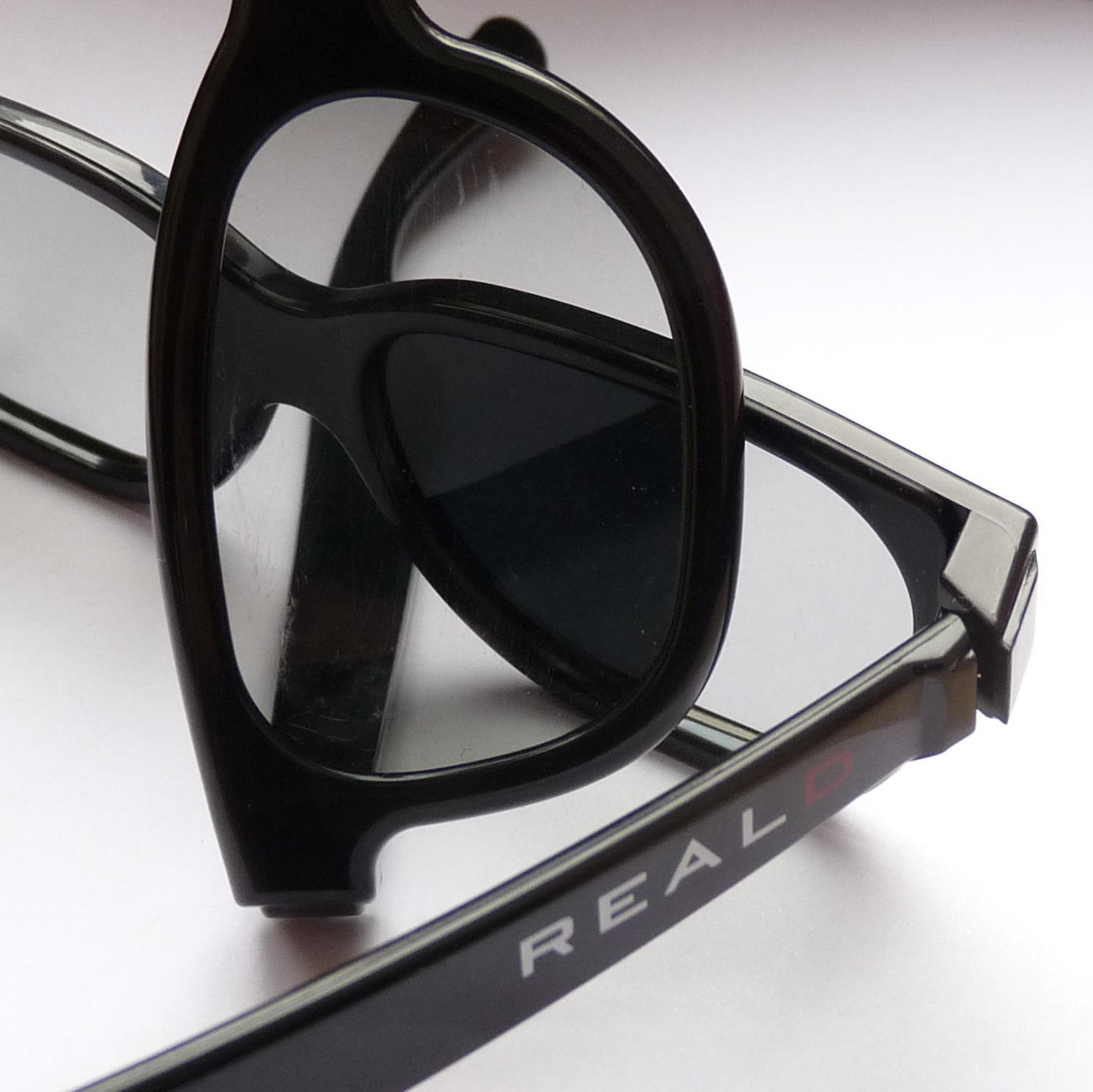
- Two pairs of RealD 3D glasses demonstrating the polarization effect
- Type: 3D projection technology
- Inventor: Lenny Lipton
- Inception: 1980
- Manufacturer: RealD
- Website: http://www.reald.com

RealD 3D is a digital stereoscopic 3D projection technology made and sold by RealD. It is currently the most widely used technology for watching 3D films in theaters.

== Technology ==
RealD 3D theater technology is a polarized 3D system that uses circularly polarized light to produce stereoscopic image projection. The advantage of circular polarization over linear polarization is that viewers are able to tilt their heads and look about the theater naturally without seeing double or darkened images. However, as with other systems, any significant head tilt will result in incorrect parallax and stop the brain from correctly connecting the stereoscopic images.

The high-resolution, digital cinema grade video projector alternately projects right-eye frames and left-eye frames, switching between them 144 times per second. The projector is either a Texas Instruments Digital Light Processing (DLP) device or Sony's reflective LCOS (liquid crystal on silicon). A push-pull electro-optical liquid crystal modulator called a ZScreen is placed immediately in front of the projector lens to alternately polarize each frame. It circularly polarizes the frames clockwise for the right eye and counter-clockwise for the left eye. The audience wears circularly polarized glasses that have oppositely polarized lenses that ensures each eye sees only its designated frame. In RealD Cinema, each frame is projected three times to reduce flicker, a system called triple flash. The source video is usually produced at 24 frames per second per eye (total 48 frames/s), which may result in subtle ghosting and stuttering on horizontal camera movements. A silver screen is used to maintain the light polarization upon reflection and to reduce reflection loss to counter some of the significant light loss due to polarization filter absorption. The result is a 3D picture that seems to extend behind and in front of the screen itself.

== History ==
Lenny Lipton developed the first flicker-free electronic stereoscopic display, and founded the company StereoGraphics Corporation in 1980. On March 1, 2003 the company RealD was founded by Joshua Greer, Michael V. Lewis, and Richard Boyd, and two years later acquired StereoGraphics and its technology. In 2005 the first commercial theater installation was rolled out in North America, and by 2009 over 10,000 theaters had 3D-enabled screens. At the same year, the movie Avatar helped increasing the popularity of 3D movies in theaters.

== See also ==
- Polarized 3D system
- List of 3D films
- Digital 3D
- IMAX 3D
- Disney Digital 3-D
- Panavision 3D
- Dolby 3D
- XpanD 3D
- MasterImage 3D
- Lenny Lipton
- 4DX
