= Siegfried & Roy: The Magic Box =

- Theatrical release poster
- Directed by: Brett Leonard
- Screenplay by: Brett Leonard; Lyn Vaus
- Produced by: Michael V. Lewis; Jini Dayaneni; Jon Ein; Lou Gonda; Robert Greenhut
- Starring: Siegfried Fischbacher; Roy Horn
- Narrated by: Anthony Hopkins
- Cinematography: Sean MacLeod Phillips
- Edited by: Jonathan P. Shaw
- Music by: Alan Silvestri
- Production companies: Film Foundry Partners; L-Squared Entertainment; Lexington Road Productions; Magic Box Productions
- Distributed by: IMAX; Hannover House (DVD); Janson Media (TV)
- Release date: October 1, 1999
- Running time: 50 minutes
- Country: United States
- Language: English

Siegfried & Roy: The Magic Box is a 1999 American biographical film about magicians Siegfried & Roy directed by Brett Leonard and starring Siegfried & Roy as themselves with narration by Anthony Hopkins.

== Plot ==
The film tells the life story of Siegfried and Roy. Siegfried discovers a magic book in a merchant's window and desires it as a means to solve his problems with his father at home. Young Roy spends time at the Zoo Bremen and eventually liberates Chico the cheetah. He takes a cruise ship bound for New York where he meets Siegfried, the resident magician, and joins his act.

== Cast ==
- Anthony Hopkins - narrator
- Siegfried Fischbacher as himself
- Roy Horn as himself
- John Summers as Teen Siegfried
- Dillon McEwin as Young Siegfried
- Cameron Alexander as himself
- Richie Solomon as himself
- Steve Tom as Mr. Nagle
- Kelly Van Halen as Mrs. Nagle
- Chris Velvin as Dancer/Assistant

== Production ==
Filming took place in Las Vegas, Nevada.

== Release ==
The film was presented at IMAX locations and also had a limited release in educational locations such as the California Science Center as well in commercial locations such as Edwards cinemas starting October 1, 1999. It was later presented at the San Francisco International Lesbian and Gay Film Festival on June 22, 2000.

== Reception ==
Lawrence Van Gelder of The New York Times wrote that the film "must be classified a disappointment" and was unimpressed with the 3D IMAX presentation, noting that "little seems wondrous" about the film.
