= Disney Digital 3-D =

Brand name by the Walt Disney Company

- Product type: Motion picture exhibition
- Current owner: The Walt Disney Company
- Introduced: June 23, 2005; 21 years ago
- Discontinued: c. November 21, 2018; 7 years ago (Note: The brand was quietly retired; this is the release date of the final film to use the label, Ralph Breaks the Internet.)

Disney Digital 3-D was a brand name used by the Walt Disney Company to describe 3D films made and released by Walt Disney Studios Motion Pictures, mostly under the Walt Disney Pictures label, and shown exclusively using digital projection.

Disney Digital 3-D in itself is not a presentation or a production format or technology, but rather purely a marketing concept. Films advertised as Disney Digital 3-D come from a number of sources, film, digital camera as well as animation software, and can be presented using any Digital 3D technology, including RealD 3D, Dolby 3D, XpanD 3D and MasterImage 3D. There is no specific handling involved.

== History ==
=== Pre-2005 Disney 3-D films ===
Disney had previously released two 3D animated shorts in 1953, Adventures in Music: Melody, the first American 3D animated short, and Working for Peanuts, starring Donald Duck and Chip 'n' Dale.

Disney also produced 3D films for its theme parks, including Disneyland's 3D Jamboree (1956), featuring the Mickey Mouse Club Mouseketeers and including Melody and Working for Peanuts; Magic Journeys (1982), Captain EO (1986), Muppet*Vision 3D (1991), Honey, I Shrunk the Audience (1994), It's Tough to Be a Bug! (1998), the film portion of Tokyo DisneySea's Magic Lamp Theater, and Mickey's PhilharMagic (2003).

Between 2003 and 2005, Dimension Films (formerly owned by The Walt Disney Company) had made a couple of 3D films. Two of them were Spy Kids 3-D: Game Over and The Adventures of Sharkboy and Lavagirl in 3-D.

=== Post-2005 Disney 3-D films ===
The first Disney Digital 3-D film was Chicken Little, which was released in late 2005. For the release, Disney collaborated with RealD to install RealD's 3D digital projection system featuring Christie CP2000 2K DLP projectors along with silver screens for 100 screens in AMC Theatres, Regal Cinemas, and Cinemark Theatres.

The animated film Chicken Little was followed by a re-release of The Nightmare Before Christmas on October 20, 2006, a 1993 stop-motion film, distributed by Touchstone Pictures, was originally shot in 2D on 35 mm film to digitally remastered, with the 3D version generated by Industrial Light & Magic (ILM) from this source using computer technology.

In 2007, Disney re-released the film Working for Peanuts with the theatrical release of the 3D version of Meet the Robinsons.

The first live-action Disney Digital 3-D release was Hannah Montana & Miley Cyrus: Best of Both Worlds Concert, which followed in 2008. In 2009, G-Force became the first film in Disney Digital 3-D from producer Jerry Bruckheimer. The 2011 film Pirates of the Caribbean: On Stranger Tides, also produced by Bruckheimer as well as directed by Rob Marshall, was one of the first big adventure films to shoot in 3D on location in jungles, beaches, and the streets of 18th-century London rather than against green screen or entirely on soundstages.

On May 29, 2009, Disney released Pixar's Up, the first Pixar film to be presented in 3D. This film was then followed by a 3D double feature re-release of Toy Story and Toy Story 2 on October 2, 2009, although neither of these films' animations was altered. Subsequent Pixar films, such as Toy Story 3 and Cars 2, were also released in Disney Digital 3-D.

Two of Disney's traditionally animated films were reissued with 3D conversions in 2011; The Lion King – released on August 26 internationally and on September 16 in North America, and Beauty and the Beast – limited to 13-day run in September at the El Capitan Theatre in Los Angeles for North America, as well as short runs in New Zealand, Japan, Australia, India and Spain in 2010. These re-releases were being supervised by Don Hahn, who produced both films. Beauty and the Beast in 3D received a wider release on January 13, 2012. Two more films were reissued in 3D in 2012; Finding Nemo on September 14 and Monsters, Inc. on December 19. The Little Mermaid was going to be re-released in 3D on September 13, 2013, but was cancelled due to the underperformance of the other Disney 3D re-releases. The 3D version of The Little Mermaid did, however, play for a limited engagement at the El Capitan Theatre from September to October 2013.

The latest film to utilize the Disney Digital 3-D name was Ralph Breaks the Internet, which released in November 21, 2018. The brand has quietly retired since.

== List of Disney Digital 3-D films ==
=== Feature films ===
==== Original releases ====
Title	Release date
Chicken Little	November 4, 2005
Meet the Robinsons	March 30, 2007
Hannah Montana & Miley Cyrus: Best of Both Worlds Concert	February 1, 2008
Bolt	November 21, 2008
Jonas Brothers: The 3D Concert Experience	February 27, 2009
Up	May 29, 2009
G-Force	July 24, 2009
A Christmas Carol	November 6, 2009
Alice in Wonderland	March 5, 2010
Toy Story 3	June 18, 2010
Tangled	November 24, 2010
Tron: Legacy	December 17, 2010
Mars Needs Moms	March 11, 2011
Pirates of the Caribbean: On Stranger Tides	May 20, 2011
Cars 2	June 24, 2011
John Carter	March 9, 2012
Frankenweenie	October 5, 2012
Wreck-It Ralph	November 2, 2012
Oz the Great and Powerful	March 8, 2013
Monsters University	June 21, 2013
Planes	August 9, 2013
Frozen	November 27, 2013
The Pirate Fairy	February 13, 2014 (International); April 1, 2014 (Vudu)
Maleficent	May 30, 2014
Planes: Fire & Rescue	July 18, 2014
Big Hero 6	November 7, 2014
Tinker Bell and the Legend of the NeverBeast	March 3, 2015 (Vudu)
Inside Out	June 19, 2015
The Good Dinosaur	November 25, 2015
The Finest Hours	January 29, 2016
Zootopia	March 4, 2016
The Jungle Book	April 15, 2016
Alice Through the Looking Glass	May 27, 2016
Finding Dory	June 17, 2016
The BFG	July 1, 2016
Pete's Dragon	August 12, 2016
Moana	November 23, 2016
Beauty and the Beast	March 17, 2017
Pirates of the Caribbean: Dead Men Tell No Tales	May 26, 2017
Cars 3	June 16, 2017
Coco	November 22, 2017
A Wrinkle in Time	March 9, 2018
Incredibles 2	June 15, 2018
The Nutcracker and the Four Realms	November 2, 2018
Ralph Breaks the Internet	November 21, 2018

==== Reissues ====
Title	Release date
The Nightmare Before Christmas (1993)	October 20, 2006
Toy Story (1995) and Toy Story 2 (1999)	October 2, 2009
Toy Story (1995)	September 12, 2025
The Lion King (1994)	September 16, 2011
Beauty and the Beast (1991)	January 13, 2012
Finding Nemo (2003)	September 14, 2012
Monsters, Inc. (2001)	December 19, 2012
The Little Mermaid (1989)	September 13 - October 13, 2013 (El Capitan Theatre)
Cars (2006)	September 4, 2026

=== Short films ===
==== Original releases ====
Title	Release date	Released with
Knick Knack (Pixar Animation Studios)	October 20, 2006	The Nightmare Before Christmas (Skellington Productions)
Working for Peanuts	March 30, 2007	Meet the Robinsons
Tokyo Mater (Pixar Animation Studios)	December 12, 2008	Bolt (Walt Disney Animation Studios)
Partly Cloudy	May 29, 2009	Up
Day & Night	June 18, 2010	Toy Story 3
Hawaiian Vacation	June 24, 2011	Cars 2
Air Mater	November 1, 2011	Cars 2 Blu-ray
Tangled Ever After	January 13, 2012	Beauty and the Beast
La Luna	June 22, 2012	Brave
Small Fry	July 26, 2012	Vudu release
Partysaurus Rex	September 14, 2012	Finding Nemo
Paperman	November 2, 2012	Wreck-It Ralph
For the Birds	December 19, 2012	Monsters, Inc.
The Blue Umbrella	June 21, 2013	Monsters University
Get a Horse!	November 27, 2013	Frozen
Feast	November 7, 2014	Big Hero 6
Lava	June 19, 2015	Inside Out
Sanjay's Super Team	November 25, 2015	The Good Dinosaur
Piper	June 17, 2016	Finding Dory
Inner Workings	November 23, 2016	Moana
Lou	June 16, 2017	Cars 3
Olaf's Frozen Adventure (Walt Disney Animation Studios)	November 22, 2017	Coco (Pixar Animation Studios)
Bao	June 15, 2018	Incredibles 2

== See also ==
- List of 3D films
- Digital cinema
- RealD 3D, Dolby 3D, Panavision 3D, IMAX 3D, 4DX, and XpanD 3D (presentation technologies)
