= GQT =

GQT may refer to:

- Gardeners' Question Time, a long-running BBC Radio 4 programme
- Goodrich Quality Theaters, an American cinema chain
