= Lumière Award =

Lumière Award may refer to:

- Lumière Award, honorary award presented at the annual Lumière Festival in Lyon
- Lumière Awards, annual awards presented by the international press in France
- Lumiere Awards, annual awards presented by the Advanced Imaging Society
- Prix Lumières (1989–2009), awarded to a Québécois director by the Association des réalisateurs et réalisatrices du Québec (ARRQ)
