= The Princess on Broadway =

1927 film

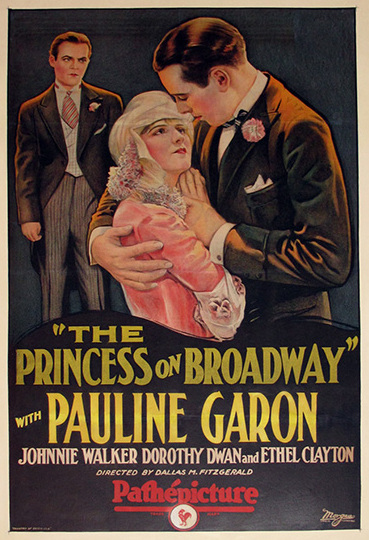
- Directed by: Dallas M. Fitzgerald
- Written by: Ethel Donoher (story); Doris Schroeder
- Produced by: J.C. Barnstyn
- Starring: Pauline Garon; Dorothy Dwan; Johnnie Walker
- Cinematography: Jack Young
- Production company: Dallas M. Fitzgerald Productions
- Distributed by: Pathé Exchange; Butcher's Film Service (UK)
- Release date: March 13, 1927
- Running time: 6 reels
- Country: United States
- Languages: Silent; English intertitles

The Princess on Broadway is a 1927 American silent comedy-drama film directed by Dallas M. Fitzgerald and starring Pauline Garon, Dorothy Dwan and Johnnie Walker.

== Cast ==
- Pauline Garon as Mary Ryan
- Dorothy Dwan as Rose Ryan
- Johnnie Walker as Leon O'Day
- Harold Miller as Seymour
- Ethel Clayton as Mrs. Seymour
- Neely Edwards as Bill Blevins

== Bibliography ==
- Munden, Kenneth White. The American Film Institute Catalog of Motion Pictures Produced in the United States, Part 1. University of California Press, 1997.
