= Are You a Failure? =

1923 silent film

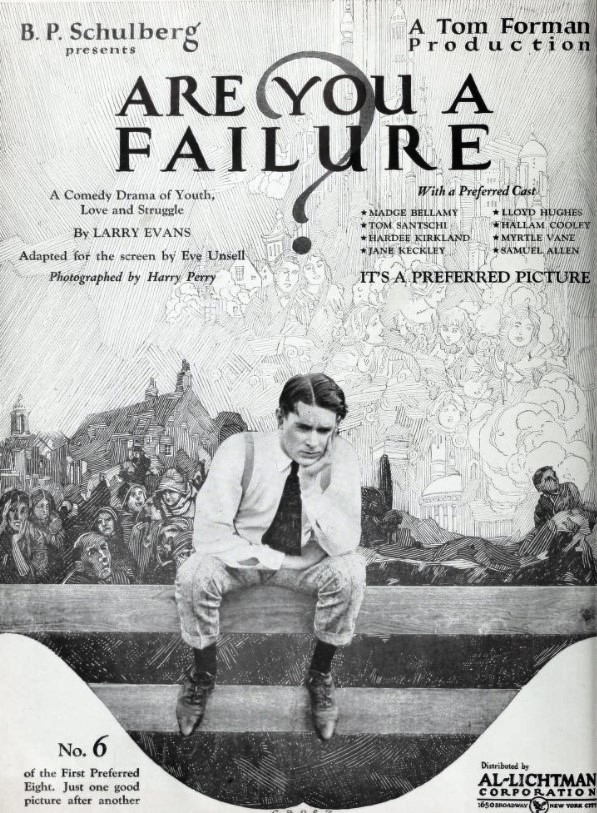
- Directed by: Tom Forman
- Written by: Larry Evans; Eve Unsell
- Produced by: B.P. Schulberg
- Starring: Madge Bellamy; Lloyd Hughes; Tom Santschi
- Cinematography: Harry Perry
- Production company: B.P. Schulberg Productions
- Distributed by: Preferred Pictures
- Release date: March 15, 1923
- Running time: 60 minutes
- Country: United States
- Languages: Silent; English intertitles

Are You a Failure? is a 1923 American silent comedy film directed by Tom Forman and starring Madge Bellamy, Lloyd Hughes and Tom Santschi.

== Plot summary ==
Pampered by his single aunts and seemingly indecisive, Oliver Wendell Blaine enrolls in a correspondence course on "success". Step by step, Oliver adheres to the course guidelines, gradually boosting his self-assurance. He emerges as a local hero when he resolves a dangerous log jam that imperils the community. Subsequently, he earns the position of river boss and ties the knot with Phyllis Thorpe, the daughter of the lumber mill owner.

== Cast ==
- Madge Bellamy as Phyllis Thorpe
- Lloyd Hughes as Oliver Wendell Blaine
- Tom Santschi as Kildevil Brenon
- Hardee Kirkland as Gregory Thorpe
- Jane Keckley as Aunt Emily
- Hallam Cooley as Emmett Graves
- Sam Allen as Thaddeus Crane
- Myrtle Vane as Aunt Charlotte

== Bibliography ==
- Munden, Kenneth White. The American Film Institute Catalog of Motion Pictures Produced in the United States, Part 1. University of California Press, 1997.
