= The Dangerous Dude =

1926 film

- Directed by: Harry Joe Brown
- Written by: Henry Roberts Symonds
- Produced by: Harry Joe Brown; W. Ray Johnston
- Starring: Reed Howes; Bruce Gordon; Dorothy Dwan
- Cinematography: Ben White
- Production company: Harry J. Brown Productions
- Distributed by: Rayart Pictures
- Release date: June 25, 1926
- Country: United States
- Languages: Silent; English intertitles

The Dangerous Dude is a 1926 American silent action film directed by Harry Joe Brown and starring Reed Howes, Bruce Gordon and Dorothy Dwan.

== Cast ==
- Reed Howes as Bob Downs
- Bruce Gordon as Harold Simpson
- Dorothy Dwan as Janet Jordan
- Billy Franey
- David Kirby
- Richard Travers

== Bibliography ==
- Munden, Kenneth White. The American Film Institute Catalog of Motion Pictures Produced in the United States, Part 1. University of California Press, 1997.
