= Advanced Imaging Society =

American media trade organisation

Logo

The Advanced Imaging Society is an organization founded in 2009 to represent artistic and technical achievements featuring stereoscopic 3D in visual media, such as television and film. It was formed by several stakeholders: Walt Disney Studios Motion Pictures, DreamWorks Animation, Sony Pictures, Paramount Pictures, IMAX, Dolby, Panasonic, and MasterImage 3D. With the organization's partnership to People's Choice Awards, their members will do votes on their favorite films across all of its categories.

== Awards ==
Since 2010, the Advanced Imaging Society has presented annual awards (Lumiere Awards; formerly known as 3D Creative Arts Awards) for technical achievements featuring stereoscopic 3D in film, television, and other media.

=== Categories ===
==== Best Feature Film – Live Action ====
| # | Year | Film | Ref. |
|---|---|---|---|
| 1st | 2010 | Avatar | |
| 2nd | 2011 | Tron: Legacy | |
| 3rd | 2012 | Hugo | |
| 4th | 2013 | Life of Pi | |
| 5th | 2014 | Gravity | |
| 6th | 2015 | Guardians of the Galaxy | |
| 7th | 2016 | Star Wars: The Force Awakens | |
| 8th | 2017 | Billy Lynn's Long Halftime Walk | |
| 9th | 2018 | Blade Runner 2049 | |
| 10th | 2019 | Black Panther | |
| 10th | 2019 | Ready Player One | |
| 11th | 2020 | Avengers: Endgame | |
| 12th | 2022 | Dune | |
| 13th | 2023 | Avatar: The Way of Water | |
| 14th | 2024 | Oppenheimer | |
| 15th | 2025 | Dune: Part Two | |
| 16th | 2026 | Sinners | |

==== Best Feature Film – Animation ====
| # | Year | Film | Ref. |
|---|---|---|---|
| 1st | 2010 | Up | |
| 2nd | 2011 | How to Train Your Dragon | |
| 3rd | 2012 | The Adventures of Tintin | |
| 4th | 2013 | Brave | |
| 5th | 2014 | Frozen | |
| 6th | 2015 | The Lego Movie | |
| 7th | 2016 | Inside Out | |
| 8th | 2017 | Zootopia | |
| 9th | 2018 | Coco | |
| 10th | 2019 | Spider-Man: Into the Spider-Verse | |
| 11th | 2020 | Frozen II | |
| 12th | 2022 | Encanto | |
| 13th | 2023 | Guillermo del Toro's Pinocchio | |
| 14th | 2024 | Spider-Man: Across the Spider-Verse | |
| 15th | 2025 | The Wild Robot | |
| 16th | 2026 | Zootopia 2 | |

==== Best 2D to 3D Conversion ====
| # | Year | Film | Ref. |
|---|---|---|---|
| 1st | 2010 | G-Force | |
| 2nd | 2011 | Alice in Wonderland | |
| 3rd | 2012 | The Lion King (3D) | |
| 4th | 2013 | The Avengers | |
| 5th | 2014 | Gravity | |
| 6th | 2015 | 300: Rise of an Empire | |
| 7th | 2016 | Star Wars: The Force Awakens | |
| 8th | 2017 | Rogue One | |
| 9th | 2018 | Blade Runner 2049 | |
| 11th | 2020 | Star Wars: The Rise of Skywalker | |
| 12th | 2022 | Shang-Chi and the Legend of the Ten Rings | |
| 13th | 2023 | Doctor Strange in the Multiverse of Madness | |
| 15th | 2025 | Deadpool & Wolverine | |

==== Governor's Cinema Award ====
A special award used to signify the film's significant experience.

| # | Year | Film | Ref. |
|---|---|---|---|
| 12th | 2022 | Spider-Man: No Way Home | |
