= The Call of the Klondike =

1926 film

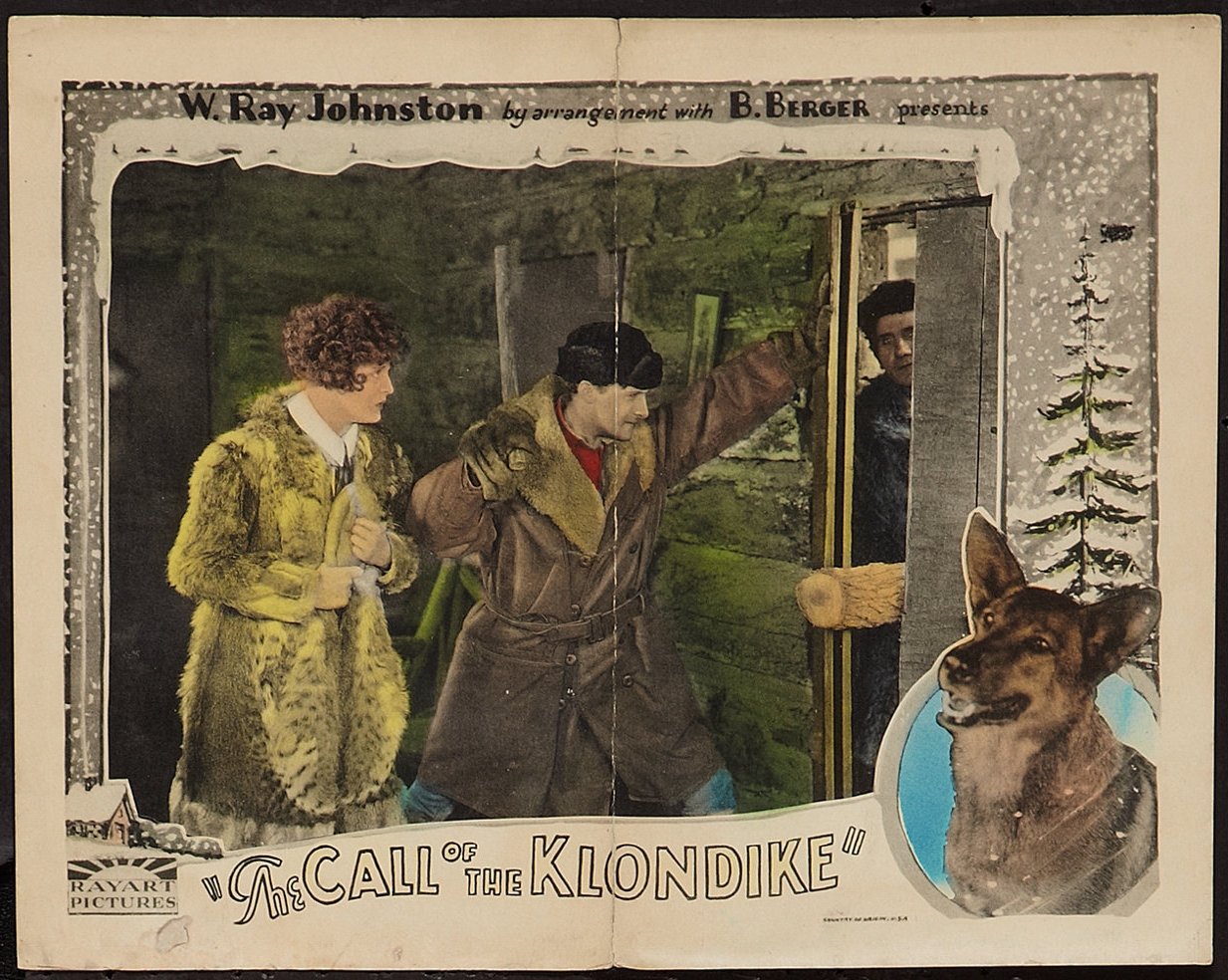
- Lobby Card
- Directed by: Oscar Apfel
- Written by: Jack Natteford
- Starring: Gaston Glass; Dorothy Dwan; Earl Metcalfe
- Cinematography: Alfred Gosden
- Production company: Paul Gerson Pictures Corporation
- Distributed by: Rayart Pictures
- Release date: June 25, 1926
- Country: United States
- Languages: Silent; English intertitles

The Call of the Klondike is a 1926 American silent Western film directed by Oscar Apfel and starring Gaston Glass, Dorothy Dwan and Earl Metcalfe.

== Cast ==
- Gaston Glass as Dick Norton
- Dorothy Dwan as Violet Winter
- Earl Metcalfe as Mortimer Pearson
- Sam Allen as Burt Kenney
- William Lowery as Owen Harkness
- Olin Francis as Tim Dolan
- Harold Holland as Downing
- Jimmy Aubrey as Bowery Bill
