= The Sea Wolf (1930 film) =

1930 film

- Theatrical release poster
- Directed by: Alfred Santell
- Screenplay by: S. N. Behrman; Ralph Block
- Based on: The Sea-Wolf; 1904 novel by Jack London
- Produced by: William Fox
- Starring: Milton Sills; Jane Keithley; Raymond Hackett; Mitchell Harris; Nat Pendleton; John Rogers
- Cinematography: Glen MacWilliams
- Edited by: Paul Weatherwax
- Production company: Fox Film Corporation
- Distributed by: Fox Film Corporation
- Release date: September 21, 1930
- Running time: 87 minutes
- Country: United States
- Language: English

The Sea Wolf is a 1930 American pre-Code drama film directed by Alfred Santell and written by S. N. Behrman and Ralph Block. The film stars Milton Sills, Jane Keithley, Raymond Hackett, Mitchell Harris, Nat Pendleton, and John Rogers. It is based on the 1904 novel The Sea-Wolf by Jack London. The film was released on September 21, 1930, by Fox Film Corporation. This was the final film starring Sills, released posthumously just one week after his sudden death at age 48.

== Cast ==
- Milton Sills as 'Wolf' Larsen
- Jane Keithley as Lorna Marsh
- Raymond Hackett as Allen Rand
- Mitchell Harris as 'Death' Larsen
- Nat Pendleton as Smoke
- John Rogers as Mugridge
- Harold Kinney as Leach
- Sam Allen as Neilson
- Harry Tenbrook as Axel Johnson

== Bear of Oakland ==
The large barkentine rigged museum ship, Bear, moored in Oakland, starred as the sealer Macedonia in the film.
