= Burning Bridges (film) =

1928 film

- Directed by: James P. Hogan
- Written by: Jack Boyle; Edward J. Meagher
- Produced by: Charles R. Rogers
- Starring: Harry Carey
- Cinematography: Sol Polito
- Edited by: Harry Marker
- Distributed by: Pathé Exchange
- Release date: September 30, 1928
- Running time: 60 minutes
- Country: United States
- Languages: Silent; English intertitles

Burning Bridges is a 1928 American silent Western film featuring Harry Carey, directed by James P. Hogan and released through Pathé Exchange.

== Cast ==
- Harry Carey as Jim Whitely/Bob Whitely
- Kathleen Collins as Ellen Wilkins
- William Bailey as Jim Black (as William N. Bailey)
- David Kirby as Crabs (as Dave Kirby)
- Raymond Wells as Slabs
- Eddie Phillips as Tommy Wilkins (as Edward Phillips)
- Florence Midgley as Widow Wilkins
- Henry A. Barrows as Ed Wilson
- Sam Allen as Dr. Zach McCarthy

== Preservation ==
With no holdings located in archives, Burning Bridges is considered a lost film.
