= Bashful Buccaneer =

1925 film

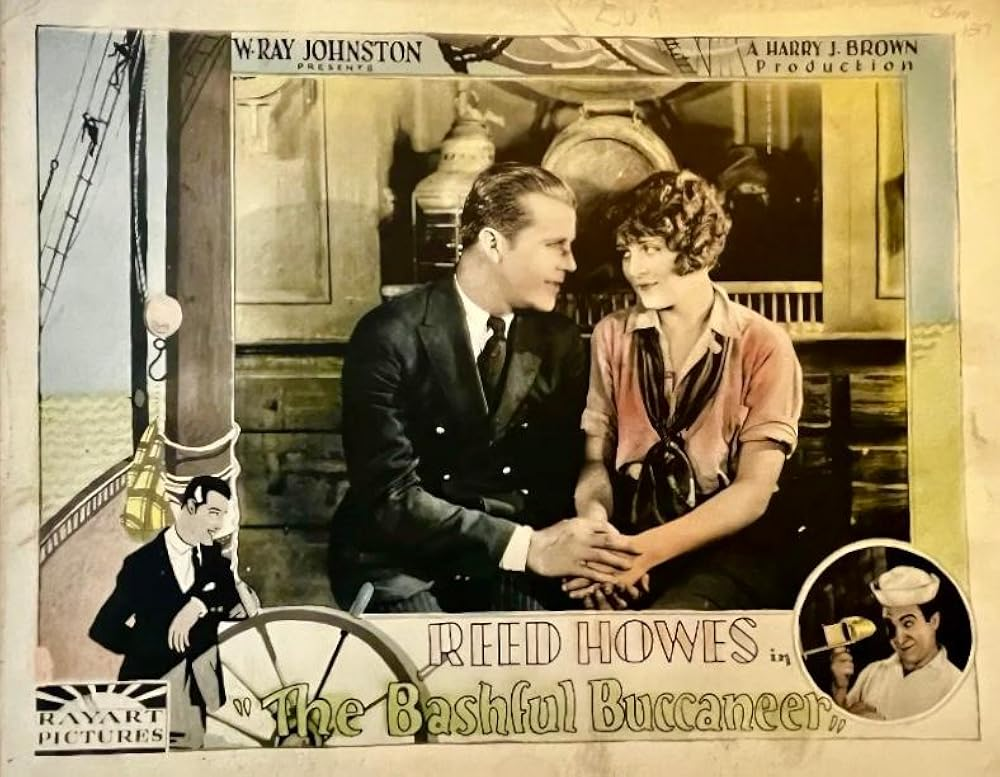
- Directed by: Harry Joe Brown
- Written by: Burke Jenkins; Krag Johnson
- Produced by: Harry Joe Brown
- Starring: Reed Howes; Dorothy Dwan; Sheldon Lewis
- Production company: Harry J. Brown Productions
- Distributed by: Rayart Pictures
- Release date: November 7, 1925
- Country: United States
- Languages: Silent; English intertitles

Bashful Buccaneer is a 1925 American silent comedy film directed by Harry Joe Brown and starring Reed Howes, Dorothy Dwan and Sheldon Lewis.

== Plot ==
Jerry Logan, a writer known for his sensational tales of sailors and the sea, lacks firsthand experience aboard ships. Curious about maritime life, he embarks on a journey. Encountering two sailors, he falls for their fabricated tale of buried treasure, concocted to assist a financially strained young woman they know. Jerry hires a rugged crew and sets sail in pursuit of the supposed riches, unwittingly thrusting himself into a series of unexpected adventures.

== Cast ==
- Reed Howes as Jerry Logan
- Dorothy Dwan as Nancy Lee
- Sheldon Lewis as First Mate
- Bull Montana as Second Mate
- Jimmy Aubrey as Cook
- Sam Allen as Captain
- George B. French as Clipper Jones
- Sailor Sharkey
- Gunboat Smith

== Censorship ==
Before Bashful Buccaneer could be exhibited in Kansas, the Kansas Board of Review required the removal of a scene where the cook drinks from a bottle.

== Preservation ==
With no holdings located in archives, Bashful Buccaneer is considered a lost film.

== Bibliography ==
- Buck Rainey. Sweethearts of the sage: biographies and filmographies of 258 actresses appearing in western movies. McFarland & Company Incorporated Pub, 1992.
