= The Land Beyond the Law =

1927 film

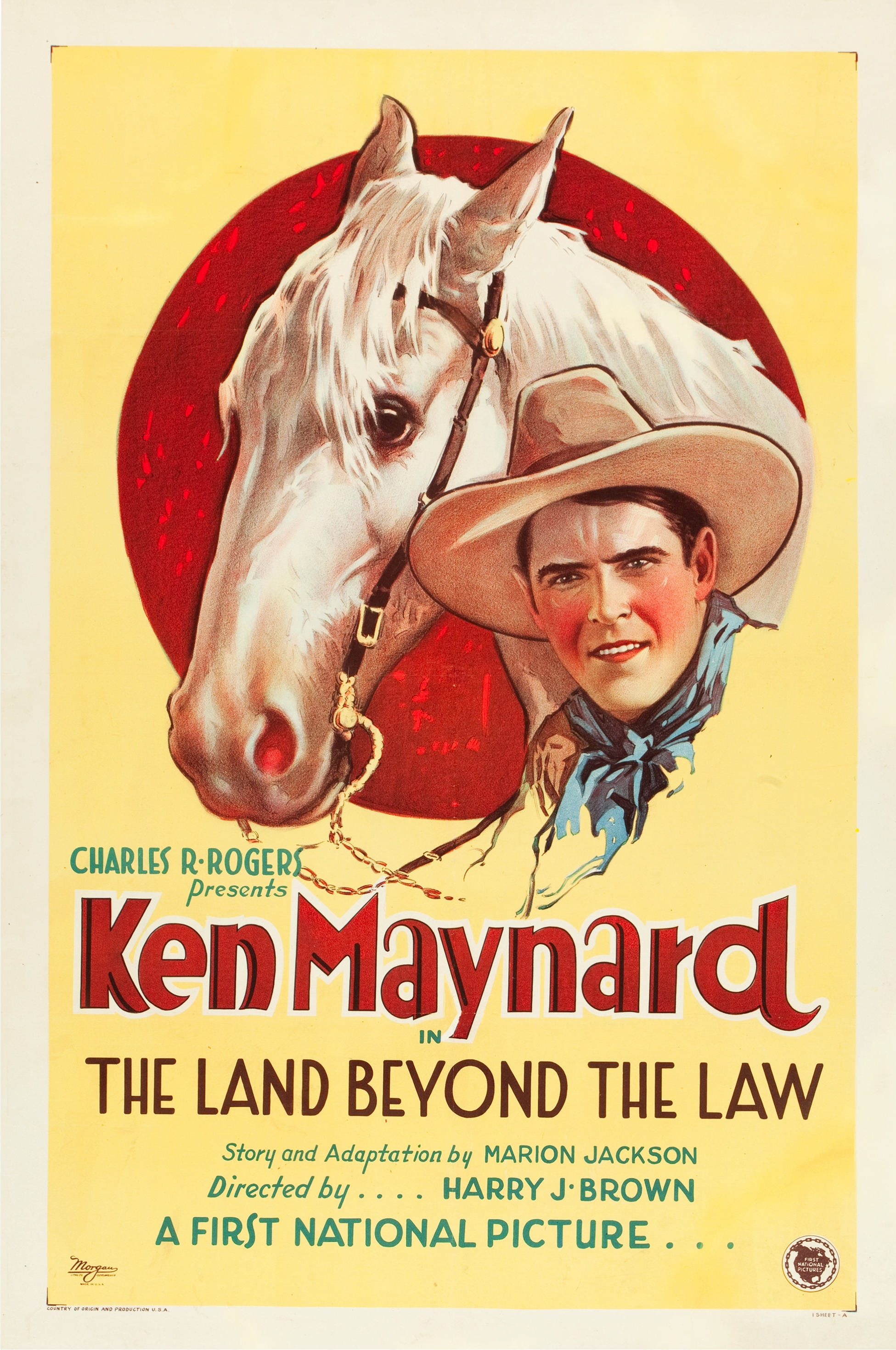
- Theatrical release poster
- Directed by: Harry Joe Brown
- Screenplay by: Marion Jackson
- Produced by: Charles R. Rogers
- Starring: Ken Maynard; Dorothy Dwan; Tom Santschi; Noah Young; Gibson Gowland; Billy Butts
- Cinematography: Sol Polito
- Production company: Charles R. Rogers Productions
- Distributed by: First National Pictures
- Release date: June 5, 1927
- Running time: 70 minutes (6,157 ft.)
- Country: United States
- Language: Silent (English intertitles)

The Land Beyond the Law is a 1927 American silent Western film directed by Harry Joe Brown and written by Marion Jackson. The film stars Ken Maynard, Dorothy Dwan, Tom Santschi, Noah Young, Gibson Gowland, and Billy Butts. The film was released on June 5, 1927, by First National Pictures.

== Cast ==
- Ken Maynard as Jerry Steele
- Dorothy Dwan as Ginger O'Hara
- Tom Santschi as Bob Crew
- Noah Young as Hanzup Harry
- Gibson Gowland as Silent 'Oklahoma' Joe
- Billy Butts as Pat O'Hara

== Preservation ==
With no prints of The Land Beyond the Law located in any film archives, it is a lost film.
