= Tumbling River =

1927 film

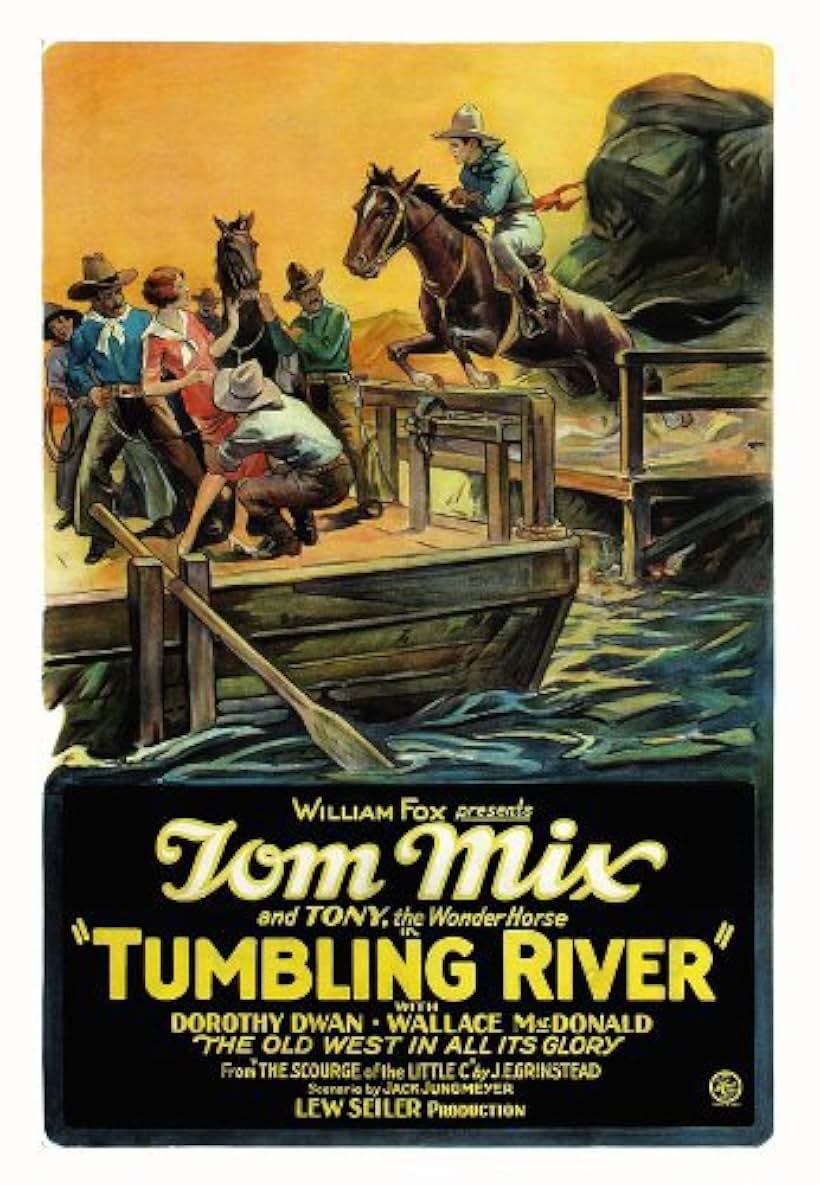
- Theatrical release poster
- Directed by: Lewis Seiler
- Screenplay by: Jack Jungmeyer
- Starring: Tom Mix; Dorothy Dwan; William Conklin; Estella Essex; Elmo Billings; Edward Peil, Sr. Wallace MacDonald
- Cinematography: Daniel B. Clark
- Production company: Fox Film Corporation
- Distributed by: Fox Film Corporation
- Release date: August 21, 1927
- Running time: 50 minutes
- Country: United States
- Languages: Silent; English intertitles

Tumbling River is a 1927 American silent Western film directed by Lewis Seiler, written by Jack Jungmeyer, and starring Tom Mix, Dorothy Dwan, William Conklin, Estella Essex, Elmo Billings, Edward Peil, Sr. and Wallace MacDonald. It was released on August 21, 1927, by Fox Film Corporation.

== Cast ==
- Tom Mix as Tom Gieer
- Dorothy Dwan as Edna Barton
- William Conklin as Jim Barton
- Estella Essex as Eileen Barton
- Elmo Billings as Kit Mason
- Edward Peil, Sr. as Roan Tibbets
- Wallace MacDonald as Keechie
- Buster Gardner as Cory
- Harry Gripp as Titus
- Buster the Horse
- Tony the Horse as Tony, Tom's Horse

== Preservation status ==
- Currently the film is lost.
