= Siegfried & Roy =

German-American entertainer duo

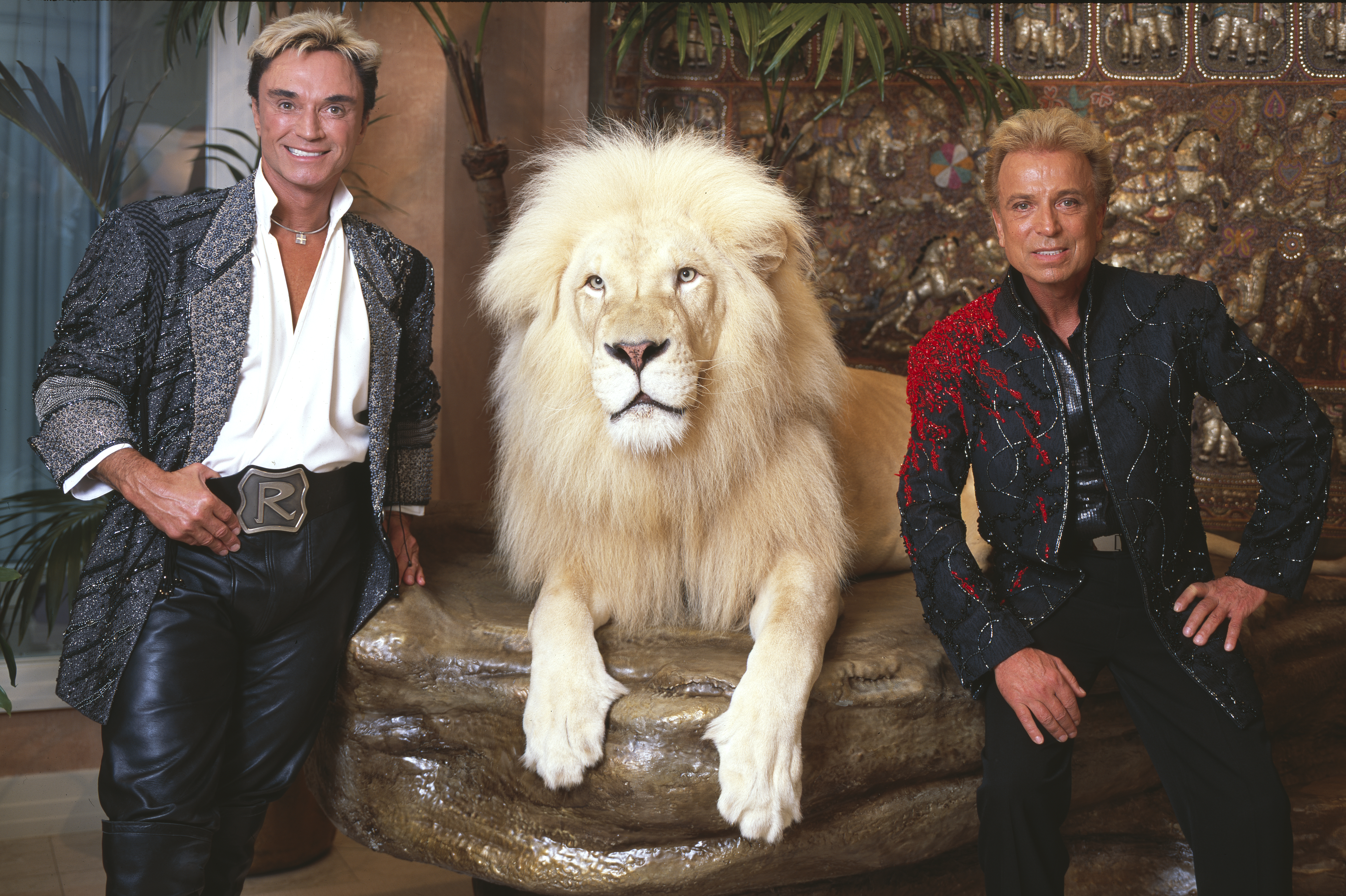
- Roy Horn (left) and Siegfried Fischbacher (right) with their white lion
- Other names: Masters of the Impossible; SARMOTI (Siegfried & Roy Masters of the Impossible)
- Occupations: Magicians; entertainers; performers
- Years active: 1959–2003; 2009–2010
- Known for: Stage acts involving big cats
- Siegfried Fischbacher
- Born: June 13, 1939; Rosenheim, Gau Munich-Upper Bavaria, Germany
- Died: January 13, 2021 (aged 81); Las Vegas, Nevada, U.S.
- Roy Horn
- Birth name: Uwe Ludwig Horn
- Born: October 3, 1944; Nordenham, Gau Weser-Ems, Germany
- Died: May 8, 2020 (aged 75); Las Vegas, Nevada, U.S.

Siegfried Fischbacher (June 13, 1939 – January 13, 2021) and Uwe Ludwig "Roy" Horn (October 3, 1944 – May 8, 2020) were German-American entertainers who performed an animal-based magic show together as Siegfried & Roy. The duo, who were also romantically involved, were best known for their flamboyant, Liberace-style costumes and use of white lions and white tigers in their acts. Siegfried was the magician, and Roy was the animal trainer.

The pair met in 1959 while both were working on a cruise ship. They then began to perform together on ships and in European clubs and theaters. In 1967, they were invited to begin performing in Las Vegas. Starting in 1990, they headlined a show at The Mirage. By 1999, the show had grossed $500 million and they were the highest-paid entertainers in Las Vegas. After 5,750 performances, their performing career ended in 2003 when Horn was critically injured by a tiger during a performance. Horn died in 2020 from COVID-19 and Fischbacher died in 2021 from pancreatic cancer.

Although the duo promoted animal conservation and rehabilitation of endangered species, they were criticized for using animals "as props" and the unnatural environment in which they were kept.

== Early lives ==
=== Siegfried Fischbacher ===
Siegfried Fischbacher was born in Rosenheim in the Free State of Bavaria of Nazi Germany on June 13, 1939, to Martin and Maria Fischbacher. His mother was a housewife and his father was a professional painter who, during World War II, was a prisoner of war in the Soviet Union. Both Siegfried and Roy's fathers were described as "violent, rage-filled alcoholics, scarred by years of fighting as Nazi soldiers"; the duo says the war changed their fathers, who resorted to alcohol to cope with what they had seen and done. Fischbacher's absorption in magic helped him cope with his father's absence; he purchased a book about magic tricks and began to practice illusions, first with his family, at age 8. He completed an apprenticeship as a carpet weaver after elementary school. He moved to Italy in 1956, where he worked as a dishwasher, bartender, and waiter at a hotel on Lake Garda where he also entertained guests and colleagues with his magic tricks. In 1988, both Fischbacher and Horn underwent naturalization to become citizens of the United States.

=== Roy Horn ===
Roy Horn was born on October 3, 1944, as Uwe Ludwig Horn, the youngest of four sons of Johanna Horn, in Nordenham in the Free State of Oldenburg of Nazi Germany in the midst of bomb attacks. Horn had three older brothers: Manfred, Alfred, and Werner. His father, a German soldier, became an alcoholic after the war and his mother left her husband and married a construction worker. His stepfather also became an alcoholic due to the effects of the war, and was unable to work. The family became dysfunctional as his mother took work in a factory. Horn became interested in animals at a very young age and cared for his childhood dog named Hexe (meaning witch). A family friend was the founder of Bremen Zoo, which gave Horn access to exotic animals from the age of 10. Horn dropped out of school at age 13. He Americanized his legal name to his nickname, Roy, when he was naturalized in the U.S. in 1988.

== Career ==
In 1959, the duo met on board the cruise ship TS Bremen where Horn, then a teenager, was working as a waiter and bellboy after fleeing his family, and Fischbacher was performing in a small magic show under the stage name Delmare. Horn challenged Fischbacher to pull a cheetah out of a hat and was then asked to be in the show. The two were fired for smuggling a live cheetah onto the ship in a laundry bag, but got a job on a cruise line operating from New York.

In 1964, the owner of the Astoria Theatre in Bremen saw the duo perform aboard a Caribbean cruise ship and recruited them to perform at her nightclub. This launched a career for the pair on the European nightclub circuit, and they began to perform with tigers. In 1966, they were invited by Grace Kelly to perform at a Red Cross charity event in Monte Carlo.

They were discovered in Paris by promoter Tony Azzie, who asked them to perform in Las Vegas in 1967, where they debuted at the Folies Bergere at The Tropicana Hotel Las Vegas. The duo were originally placed 14th on a long bill. In 1975, they won the "Magician of the Year" award by the Academy of Magical Arts. By 1978, they had become the grand finale of the show and it was moved by Frank Rosenthal to the Stardust Resort and Casino, where the duo was featured on the marquee.

In 1981, Kenneth Feld of Feld Entertainment started the Beyond Belief variety show with the duo at the New Frontier Hotel and Casino. There, they acquired an elephant and also performed with King Charles Troupe, an African-American unicycle and basketball group, and were criticized by some people for performing in a mixed-race act. In the fall of 1988, the show was revamped and went on a world tour.

In 1990, the duo were hired by Steve Wynn in a five-year, $57.5 million contract and the show was moved to The Mirage, then a newly opened casino, where they performed until 2003. The production and customized theater cost $30 million, an exorbitant amount for the time, and was often sold out.

By 1999, the show had grossed $500 million and they were the highest-paid entertainers in Las Vegas. That year, their names were added to the Hollywood Walk of Fame.

== 2003 tiger accident ==
During a show at the Mirage on October 3, 2003, Horn was attacked by a seven-year-old, 400-pound (180 kg) white tiger named Mantacore. After being introduced, Mantacore incorrectly moved towards the front of the stage and the audience. As Horn tried to move him into place, the tiger bit into his sleeve. Horn lightly struck the tiger on the nose with the microphone, and the tiger eventually released him, however, as Horn retreated, the tiger leapt at him and knocked him down. Mantacore then bit into his neck and dragged him offstage. He was finally released after trainers discharged a fire extinguisher to distract the tiger and jammed their index fingers into its mouth. Horn was critically injured: he suffered a stroke (after the attack), had his spine severed, lost a large amount of blood and had permanent impairment to his motor and verbal abilities (including partial paralysis on the left side of his body). The video of the attack taken by the theater cameras was never publicly released. While en route to the hospital, Horn described Mantacore as "a great cat" and stated that he wanted no harm to be done to the tiger; Horn claimed that Mantacore was actually trying to help him after the stroke. The show, which had a staff of 267 cast and crew members, was then shut down.

In March 2019, trainer Chris Lawrence, who tried to help Horn during the incident, leading to post-traumatic stress disorder, alleged that Horn treated the animals "like props" and that this reason was covered up to protect the brand. The duo dismissed Lawrence's claims, saying he "had problems with his life anyway".

== Aftermath and retirement ==
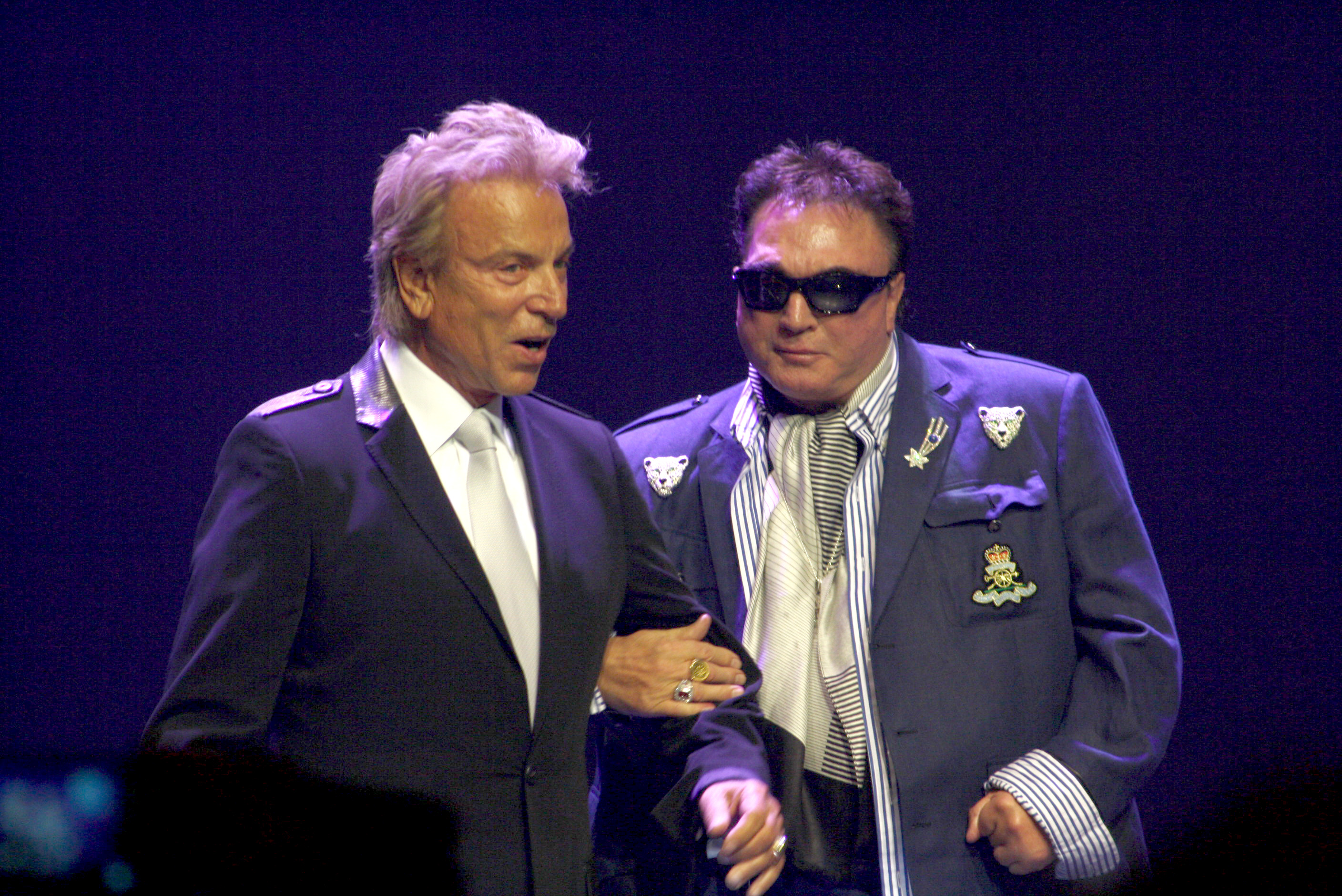
Siegfried and Roy in April 2012

Horn spent many months in hospitals and clinics for rehabilitation, completing daily physical therapy and had his property adjusted for his disabilities. In February 2009, the duo staged a final appearance with Mantacore at the Bellagio as a benefit for the Lou Ruvo Brain Institute (though Chris Lawrence has stated this performance involved a different tiger), which was broadcast on 20/20. On April 23, 2010, they officially retired from show business, with Roy still suffering from his injuries. On March 19, 2014, aged 17, Mantacore died after a brief illness.

== Personal lives ==
=== Romantic involvement ===
Fischbacher and Horn were romantically involved. The couple lived together at Jungle Palace, a Moroccan-themed, 8-acre (3.2 ha) estate in the Las Vegas area, part of their 80-acre (32 ha) property they called "Little Bavaria", although they had separate houses on the property since 1996. In August 2007, the duo came out as gay in the National Enquirer, but then reverted to their preferred state of privacy.

=== Religion ===
Fischbacher and Horn were devout Catholics and had a chapel in their home. Fischbacher's sister was a nun.

=== Illnesses and deaths ===
Horn died on May 8, 2020, at Mountain View Hospital in Las Vegas, aged 75, ten days after it was announced that he contracted COVID-19. Fischbacher had heart surgery in 2019 and died on January 13, 2021, at his home in North Las Vegas, aged 81, two days after it was reported that he had pancreatic cancer and had been in hospice care. They were both cremated and their remains are together in an undisclosed location in Nevada. Their personal items were auctioned by Bonhams in June 2022, with all of the $1.4 million in proceeds going to their personal charity, the SARMOTI (Siegfried And Roy, Masters Of The Impossible) Foundation, for the protection of endangered species.

== Legacy ==
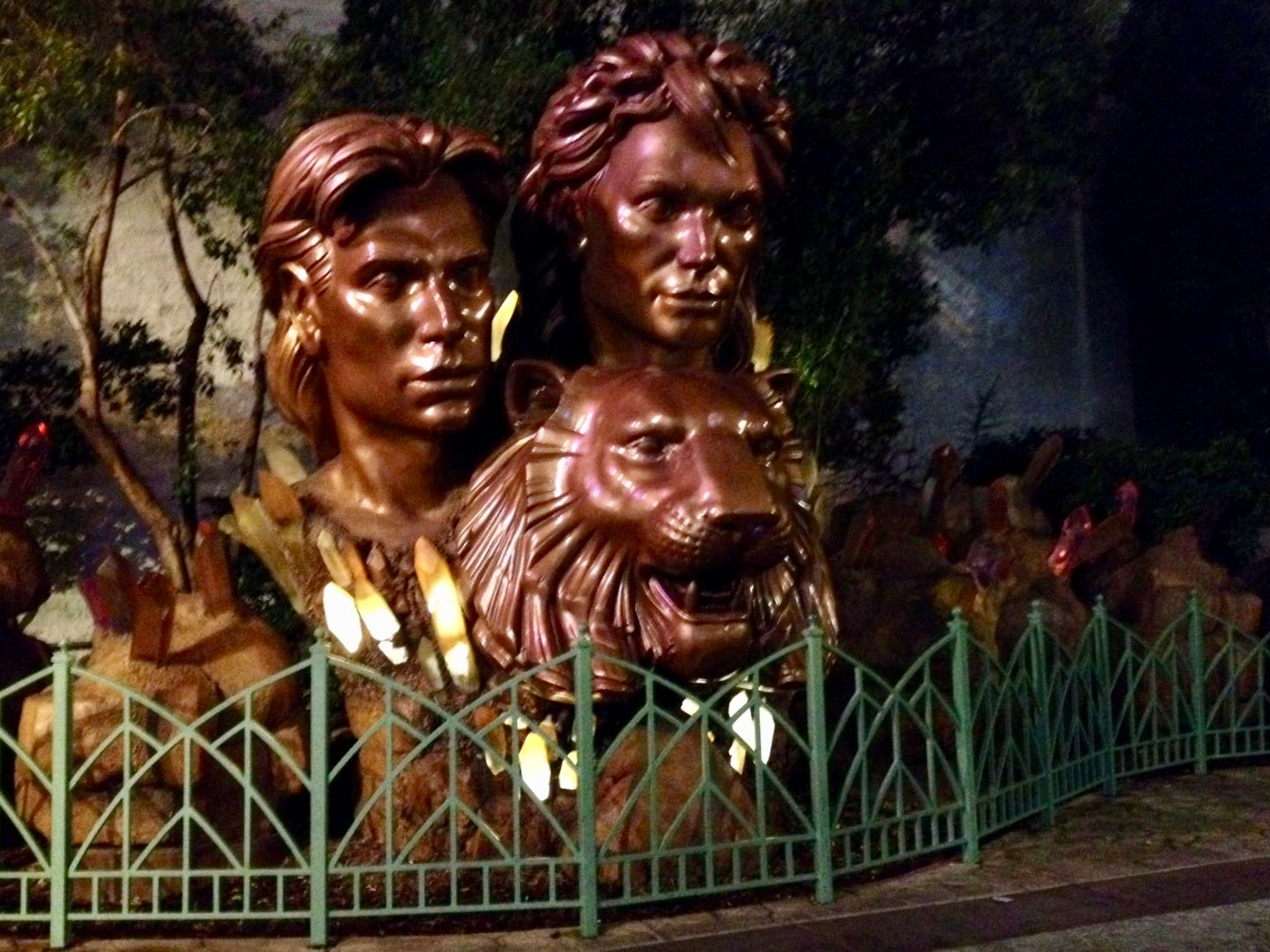
Siegfried & Roy monument in Las Vegas

South of Sunset Road in Las Vegas Valley lie two frontage roads of Clark County Route 215. The eastbound road is named after Roy Horn. Furthermore, the driveway leading to the Hard Rock hotel and casino is named "Siegfried and Roy Drive".

== In media ==
=== Filmography ===
- In Casino (1995) fictional duet Jonathan & David newly performing in Tangiers is a nod to Siegfried & Roy's iconic show's move to Stardust after being invited by Frank Rosenthal, who himself was the inspiration for Sam Rothstein
- Vegas Vacation (1997) – cameo appearances
- Ocean's Eleven (2001) – cameo appearance as audience members of a boxing match
- Showboy (2002)

=== Television ===
- Bassie & Adriaan (1994, TV series) – cameo appearance
- Siegfried & Roy: The Magic Returns on 20/20 (March 6, 2009)

=== Animations ===
- Siegfried & Roy: Masters of the Impossible (1996) – animated series to introduce children to magic
- Father of the Pride (2004–2005, TV series) – an animated sitcom about a lion who performs in the Siegfried & Roy show. The show was not well received and was almost cancelled before release.
- The Simpsons (1989–) did a parody of the duo named Ernst and Gunter in the Season 5 episode "$pringfield (or, How I Learned to Stop Worrying and Love Legalized Gambling)". They made subsequent appearances in later episodes including Season 9 Episode 7, "The Two Mrs. Nahasapeemapetilons"; Season 10 Episode 10, "Viva Ned Flanders"; and Season 18 Episode 2, "Jazzy and the Pussycats".

=== Bios ===
- Siegfried & Roy: The Magic Box (1999) – a 50-minute 3-D Imax film narrated by Anthony Hopkins.

==== Planned biopics ====
- Rights to a biopic on the lives of the duo were acquired by Philipp Stölzl in June 2016 and by Michael "Bully" Herbig in 2019; however, they were never developed.

=== Books ===
- Siegfried and Roy: mastering the impossible (1992)

=== Podcasts ===
- Wild Things: Siegfried & Roy – Apple Podcasts – 8 full episodes (2022)

=== Miniseries ===
- Wild Things, a miniseries based on the podcast Wild Things: Siegfried & Roy by Steven Leckart, began development for Apple TV in October 2022, with John Robert Hoffman as writer and executive producer. In May 2025, Jude Law was cast as Siegfried and Andrew Garfield was cast as Roy. Matt Shakman was hired to direct the pilot. Filming began in January 2026. The series is scheduled to premiere on April 16, 2027.
