= Aluminized screen =

Type of cathode-ray tube for video display

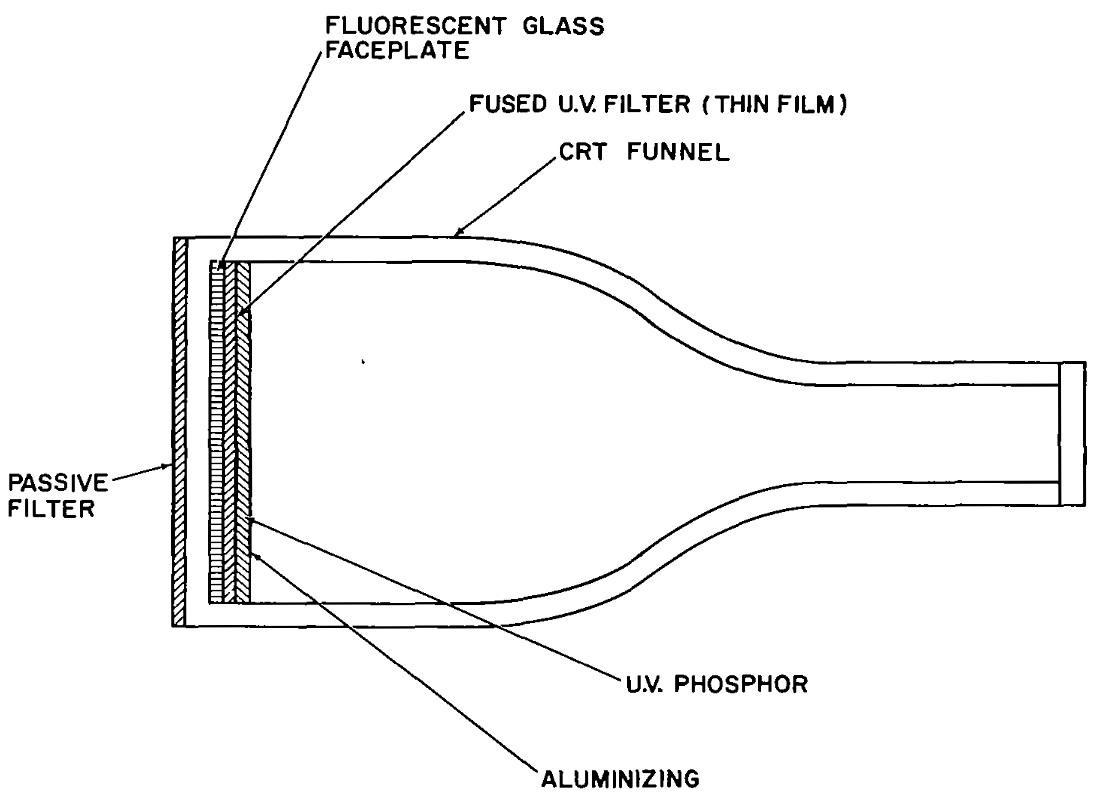
A diagram of a CRT showing the aluminium layer behind the phosphors

Aluminized screen may refer to a type of cathode-ray tube (CRT) for video display or to a type of projection screen for showing motion pictures or slides, especially in polarized 3D.

Some cathode-ray tubes, e.g., television picture tubes, include a thin layer of aluminium deposited on the back surface of their internal phosphor screen coating. Light from an excited area of the phosphor, which would otherwise wastefully shine back into the tube, is instead reflected forward through the phosphor coating, increasing the total visible light output by around a factor of two. As well, it prevents physical phosphor degradation, "phosphor poisoning", increasing the longevity of the device, and it may also act as a heat sink. The aluminium layer must be thick enough to reflect light efficiently, yet not so thick as to absorb too great a proportion of the electron beam that excites the phosphor.

Some projection screens have an aluminized surface, usually an aluminium paint rather than a metal sheet. They reflect polarized light without altering its polarization. This is necessary when showing 3D films as left-eye and right-eye views are superimposed but oppositely polarized (typically at opposite 45-degree angles to the vertical if linearly polarized, right-handed and left-handed if circularly polarized). Audience members wear polarized glasses that allow only the correct image to be seen by each eye.

== See also ==
- Thin-film deposition
- Silver screen
- Stereoscopy
