= The California Mail =

1929 American film

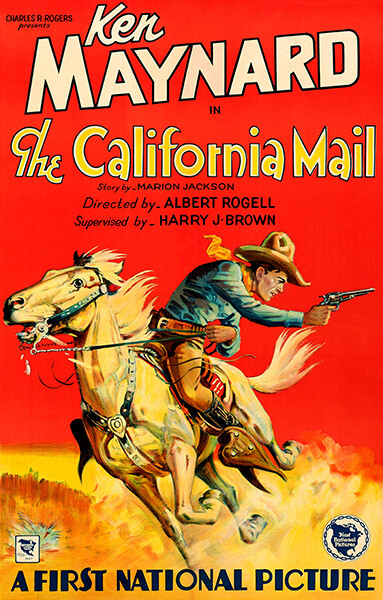
- Theatrical release poster
- Directed by: Albert S. Rogell
- Screenplay by: Marion Jackson; Leslie Mason
- Story by: Marion Jackson
- Starring: Ken Maynard; Dorothy Dwan; Lafe McKee; Paul Hurst; C.E. Anderson; Fred Burns
- Cinematography: Frank B. Good
- Edited by: Fred Allen
- Production company: First National Pictures
- Distributed by: First National Pictures
- Release date: April 7, 1929
- Running time: 60 minutes
- Country: United States
- Languages: Silent; English intertitles

The California Mail is a 1929 American silent Western film directed by Albert S. Rogell and written by Marion Jackson and Leslie Mason. The film stars Ken Maynard, Dorothy Dwan, Lafe McKee, Paul Hurst, C.E. Anderson and Fred Burns. The film was released on April 7, 1929, by First National Pictures. This film proved to be the last completely silent feature released by First National without a soundtrack.

== Cast ==
- Ken Maynard as Bob Scott
- Dorothy Dwan as Molly Butler
- Lafe McKee as William Butler
- Paul Hurst as Rowdy Ryan
- C.E. Anderson as Butch McGraw
- Fred Burns as John Harrison
- Tarzan as Tarzan

== Preservation ==
With no holdings located in archives, The California Mail is considered a lost film.

== See also ==
- List of films and television shows about the American Civil War
