= Polarized 3D system =

Using polarized light to create a 3D image

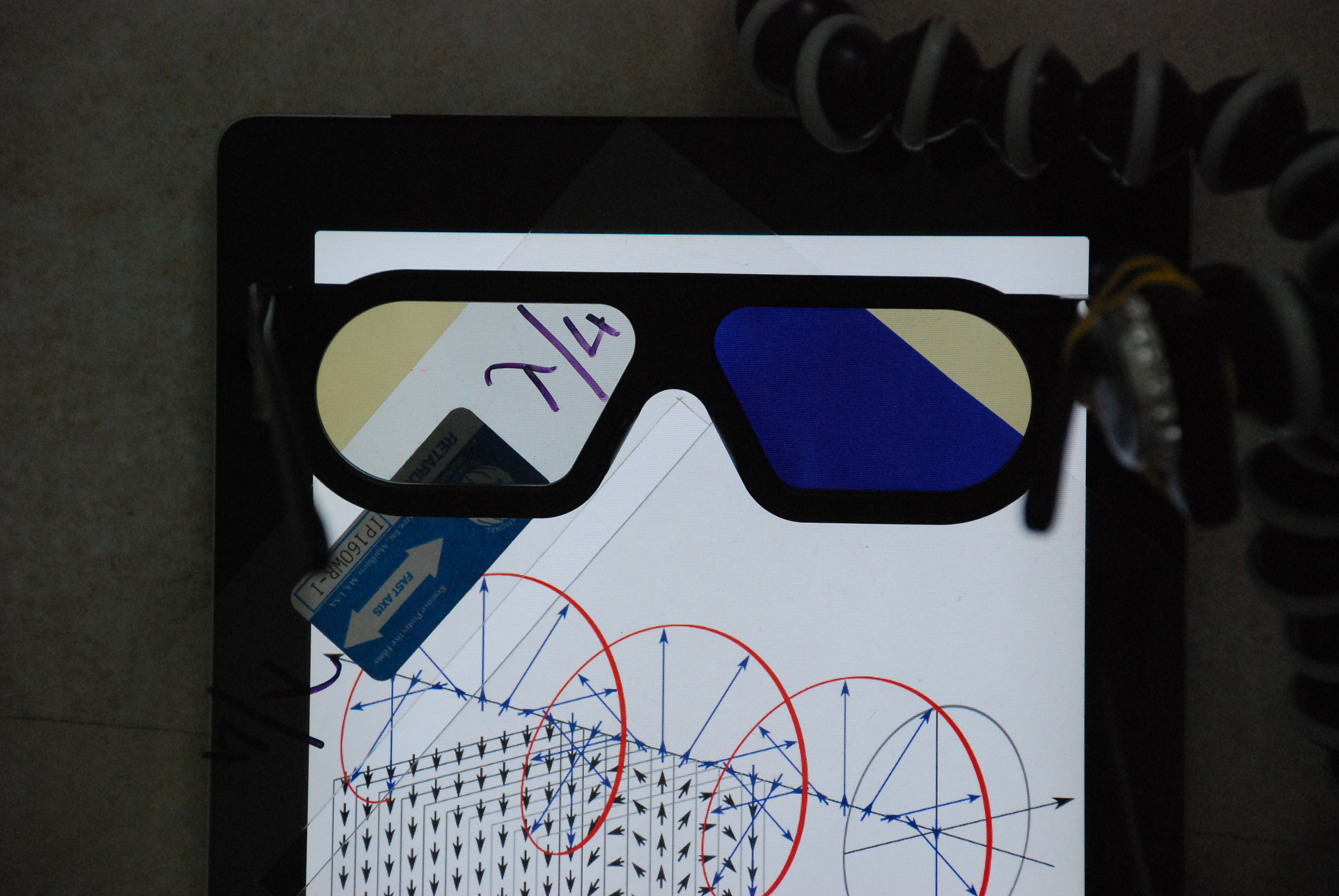
Circularly polarized 3D glasses in front of an LCD (Liquid Crystal Display) tablet with a quarter-wave retarder on top of it; the λ/4 plate at 45° produces a definite handedness, which is transmitted by the left filter but blocked by the right filter.

A polarized 3D system uses polarization glasses to invoke stereopsis from binocular disparity in the people viewing the visual content. It works by restricting the light that reaches each eye so that each eye sees a different generated view.

To present stereoscopic images and films, two images are projected superimposed onto the same screen or displayed through different polarizing filters. The viewer wears low-cost eyeglasses with a polarizing filter for each eye. The left and right filters have different polarizations, so each eye receives only the image with the matching polarization. This is used to produce a three-dimensional effect by projecting the same scene into both eyes, but depicted from slightly different perspectives with different polarizations. Multiple people can view the stereoscopic images simultaneously.

Polarized 3D systems, and stereoscopy systems in general, commonly exhibit the Vergence-Accommodation Conflict.

== Types of polarized glasses ==
=== Linearly polarized glasses ===
To present a stereoscopic motion picture, two images are projected superimposed onto the same screen through orthogonal polarizing filters (Usually at 45 and 135 degrees). The viewer wears linearly polarized eyeglasses which also contain a pair of orthogonal polarizing filters oriented the same as the projector. As each filter only passes light that is similarly polarized and blocks orthogonally polarized light, each eye sees only one of the projected images, and the 3D effect is achieved. Linearly polarized glasses require the viewer to keep their head level, as tilting of the viewing filters will cause the images of the left and right channels to bleed over to the opposite channel. This can make prolonged viewing uncomfortable as head movement is limited to maintain the 3D effect.

A linear polarizer converts an unpolarized beam into one with a single linear polarization. The vertical components of all waves are transmitted, while the horizontal components are absorbed and reflected.

=== Circularly polarized glasses ===
To present a stereoscopic motion picture, two images are projected superimposed onto the same screen through circular polarizing filters of opposite handedness. The viewer wears eyeglasses that contain a pair of analyzing filters (circular polarizers mounted in reverse) of opposite handedness. Left-circularly polarized light is blocked by the right-handed analyzer, while right-circularly polarized light is blocked by the left-handed analyzer. The result is similar to that of stereoscopic viewing using linearly polarized glasses, except the viewer can tilt their head and still maintain left/right separation (although stereoscopic image fusion will be lost due to the mismatch between the eye plane and the original camera plane).

Circular polarizer passing left-handed, counter-clockwise circularly polarized light

As shown in the figure, the analyzing filters are constructed of a quarter-wave plate (QWP) and a linearly polarized filter (LPF). The QWP always transforms circularly polarized light into linearly polarized light. However, the angle of polarization of the linearly polarized light produced by a QWP depends on the handedness of the circularly polarized light entering the QWP. In the illustration, the left-handed circularly polarized light entering the analyzing filter is transformed by the QWP into linearly polarized light which has its direction of polarization along the transmission axis of the LPF. Therefore, in this case the light passes through the LPF. In contrast, right-handed circularly polarized light would have been transformed into linearly polarized light that had its direction of polarization along the absorbing axis of the LPF, which is at right angles to the transmission axis, and it would have therefore been blocked.

By rotating either the QWP or the LPF by 90 degrees about an axis perpendicular to its surface (i.e. parallel to the direction of propagation of the light wave), one may build an analyzing filter which blocks left-handed, rather than right-handed circularly polarized light. Rotating both the QWP and the LPF by the same angle does not change the behaviour of the analyzing filter.

== System construction and examples ==
Polarized light reflected from an ordinary motion picture screen typically loses most of its polarization, but the loss is negligible if a silver screen or aluminized screen is used. This means that a pair of aligned DLP projectors, some polarizing filters, a silver screen, and a computer with a dual-head graphics card can be used to form a relatively high-cost (over US$10,000 in 2010) system for displaying stereoscopic 3D data simultaneously to a group of people wearing polarized glasses.

In the case of RealD 3D, a circularly polarizing liquid crystal filter which can switch polarity 144 times per second is placed in front of the projector lens. Only one projector is needed, as the left and right eye images are displayed alternately. Sony features a new system called RealD 3D XLS, which shows both circularly polarized images simultaneously: A single 4K projector displays two 2K images one above the other, a special lens attachment polarizes and projects the images on top of each other.

Optical attachments can be added to traditional 35 mm projectors to adapt them for projecting film in the "over-and-under" format, in which each pair of images is stacked within one frame of film. The two images are projected through different polarizers and superimposed on the screen. This is a very cost-effective way to convert a theater for 3D as all that is needed are the attachments and a non-depolarizing screen surface, rather than a conversion to digital 3D projection. Thomson Technicolor currently produces an adapter of this type.

When stereo images are to be presented to a single user, it is practical to construct an image combiner, using partially silvered mirrors and two image screens at right angles to one another. One image is seen directly through the angled mirror whilst the other is seen as a reflection. Polarized filters are attached to the image screens and appropriately angled filters are worn as glasses. A similar technique uses a single screen with an inverted upper image, viewed in a horizontal partial reflector, with an upright image presented below the reflector, again with appropriate polarizers.

=== TV and computer screens ===
Polarizing techniques are easier to apply with cathode-ray tube (CRT) technology than with Liquid crystal display (LCD). Ordinary LCD screens already contain polarizers for control of pixel presentations — this can interfere with these techniques.

In 2003, Keigo Iizuka discovered an inexpensive implementation of this principle on laptop computer displays using cellophane sheets.

One can construct a low-cost polarized projection system by using a computer with two projectors and an aluminium foil screen. The dull side of aluminium foil is brighter than most silver screens. This was demonstrated at PhraJomGlao University, Nônthaburi, Thailand, September 2009.

=== Health care ===
In optometry and ophthalmology, polarized glasses are used for various tests of binocular depth perception (i.e. stereopsis).

== History ==
Polarized 3D projection was explored experimentally in the 1890s. The projectors used Nicol Prisms for polarization. Packs of thin glass sheets, angled so as to reflect away light of the unwanted polarity, served as the viewing filters. Polarized 3D glasses only became practical after the invention of Polaroid plastic sheet polarizers by Edwin Land, who was privately demonstrating their use for projecting and viewing 3D images in 1934. They were first used to show a 3D movie to the general public at "Polaroid on Parade", a New York Museum of Science and Industry exhibit that opened in December 1936. 16 mm Kodachrome color film was used. Details about the glasses are not available. At the 1939 New York World's Fair, a short polarized 3D film was shown at the Chrysler Motors pavilion and seen by thousands of visitors daily. The hand-held cardboard viewers, a free souvenir, were die-cut in the shape of a 1939 Plymouth seen head-on. Their Polaroid filters, stapled over rectangular openings where the headlights ought to be, were very small.

Cardboard glasses with earpieces and larger filters were used to watch Bwana Devil, the feature-length color 3D film that premiered on 26 November 1952 and ignited a brief but intense 3D fad in the 1950s. The well-known Life magazine photo of an audience wearing 3D glasses was one of a series taken at the premiere. The film's title, imprinted on the earpieces, is plainly visible in high-resolution copies of those images. Imaginatively colorized versions have helped to spread the myth that the 3D movies of the 1950s were projected by the anaglyph color filter method. In fact, during the 1950s, anaglyph projection was used only for a few short films. Beginning in the 1970s, some 1950s 3D feature films were re-released in anaglyph form so that they could be shown without special projection equipment. There was no commercial advantage in advertising the fact that it was not the original release format.

Polaroid filters in disposable cardboard frames were typical during the 1950s, but more comfortable plastic frames with somewhat larger filters, considerably more expensive for the theater owner, were also in use. Patrons were normally instructed to turn them in when leaving so that they could be sanitized and reissued, and it was not uncommon for ushers to be stationed at the exits to attempt to collect them from forgetful or souvenir-loving patrons.

Cardboard and plastic frames continued to co-exist during the following decades, with one or the other favored by a particular film distributor or theater or for a particular release. Specially imprinted or otherwise custom-made glasses were sometimes used. Some showings of Andy Warhol's Frankenstein during its 1974 U.S. first run featured unusual glasses consisting of two stiff plastic polarizers held together by two thin silver plastic tubes slit lengthwise, one attached across the tops and bent at the temples to form earpieces, the other a short length bent in the middle and serving as the bridge piece. The design managed to be both stylish in an appropriately Warhol-esque way and self-evidently simple to manufacture from the raw sheet and tube stock.

Linear polarization was standard into the 1980s and beyond.

In the 2000s, computer animation, digital projection, and the use of sophisticated IMAX 70 mm film projectors, have created an opportunity for a new wave of polarized 3D films.

In the 2000s, RealD Cinema and MasterImage 3D were introduced, both using circular polarization.

At IBC 2011 in Amsterdam RAI several companies, including Sony, Panasonic, JVC & others highlighted their upcoming 3D stereoscopic product portfolios for both the professional and consumer markets to use the same polarization technique as RealD 3D Cinema uses for stereoscopy. These highlighted products cover everything from recording, projecting, viewing and digital display technologies to live, recorded and pre- and post-production facilities and soft- and hardware-based products to facilitate 3D content creation. Their systems are interoperable and compatible with existing, passive RealD 3D glasses.

== Advantages and disadvantages ==
Compared to anaglyph images, the use of polarized 3D glasses produces a full-color image that is considerably more comfortable to watch and is not subject to binocular rivalry. However, it requires a significant increase in expense: even the low cost polarized glasses typically cost 50% more than comparable red-cyan filters, and while anaglyph 3D films can be printed on one line of film, a polarized film was often done with a special set up that uses two projectors. The use of multiple projectors also raises issues with synchronization, and a poorly synchronized film would negate any increased comfort from the use of polarization. This problem was solved by a number of single-strip polarized systems which were standard in the 1980s.

Particularly with the linear polarization schemes popular since the 1950s, the use of linear polarization meant that a level head was required for any sort of comfortable viewing; any effort to tilt the head sideways would result in the polarization failing, ghosting, and both eyes seeing both images. Circular polarization has alleviated this problem, allowing viewers to tilt their heads slightly (although any offset between the eye plane and the original camera plane will still interfere with the perception of depth).

Because neutral-gray linear-polarizing filters are easily manufactured, correct color rendition is possible. Circular-polarizing filters often have a slight brownish tint, which may be compensated for during projection.

Until 2011, home 3D television and home 3D computers primarily used active shutter glasses with LCD or plasma displays. TV manufacturers (LG, Vizio) have introduced displays with horizontal polarizing stripes overlaying the screen. The stripes alternate polarization with each line. This permits using relatively inexpensive passive viewing glasses, similar to those for movies. The principal disadvantages are that each polarization can display only half as many scanning lines, vertical viewing angles are narrow compared to active shutter 3D, and the images for polarized glasses must share the screen simultaneously in which native resolution is downgraded for both sides of the image delivered to each eye simultaneously. A full 1080p picture results from image fusion.

== See also ==
- Vectograph
