= Michael V. Lewis =

Puerto Rico-born American CEO and entrepreneur in media

- Born: San Juan, Puerto Rico
- Occupation(s): Media Entrepreneur, Co-Founder and Former CEO/Chairman of RealD
- Years active: 1993–present

Michael V. Lewis (born July 6, 1963) is an American CEO and entrepreneur in media, entertainment and technology. After working as Senior Vice President at InterMedia, a media investment banking and advisory firm, he co-founded and was CEO of L-Squared Entertainment, a digital entertainment studio. In 2003, he co-founded and is CEO of RealD, a global licensor of visual and 3D technologies that maintained the largest 3D cinema platform in the world. Additionally, Lewis is a prominent donor to the Motion Picture Television Fund and is a member of the City Year Los Angeles Board of Directors.

== Early life and education ==
Lewis, an only child, grew up in Central Florida. His father was a real estate developer and his mother was a linguist and a flight attendant with Pan American Airways. Lewis became interested in the entertainment industry at age of 14, after viewing Star Wars multiple times. He graduated from the University of Florida in 1985. His first job in the film business was as a production assistant on the movie About Last Night, starring Demi Moore and Rob Lowe.

== Career ==
=== InterMedia ===
Prior to founding his own companies, Lewis was a Senior Vice President of InterMedia/Film Equities, a media investment banking and advisory company.

=== L-Squared Entertainment ===
In 1994, Lewis cofounded L-Squared Entertainment, a digital entertainment studio which specialized in using new technologies in the entertainment industry. The company was acclaimed for its PC-generated digital effects in the film Virtuosity. Lewis was a producer on the 3D movie Siegfried and Roy: The Magic Box, which won a MAXI award for best 3D picture in 1999, and he also co-produced the 3D movie T-Rex: Back To The Cretaceous. The company also produced for CAA and Intel New Media Lab Virtual Studio Tour starring Danny DeVito

=== RealD ===
In 2003, Lewis cofounded RealD, a visual entertainment technology company headquartered in Beverly Hills with offices in Boulder, London, Shanghai, Beijing, Moscow, Tokyo, Taiwan, and Hong Kong. The first film to use RealD 3D technology was Disney's 2005 film Chicken Little. RealD has since become the world's largest 3D cinema platform with more than 27,500 screens in 72 countries, with over 1.5 billion people having seen a movie in RealD 3D. Michael was executive producer for the films Madam Butterfly 3D and Carmen 3D, both of which were presented in RealD 3D.

In 2010, Lewis made RealD available for public trading. The company is traded on the New York Stock Exchange under the symbol RLD. RealD was named as one of the world's most innovative companies by Fast Company magazine.

In November 2015, RealD announced it would be sold to private-equity firm Rizvi Traverse Management, LLC for approximately $551 million. The merger was completed in February 2016.

== Awards ==
Lewis received the Producers Guild of America Vanguard Award, which recognizes achievements in new media and technology. He also received the Special Award For Achievement for Technical Contributions to the Motion Picture Industry at the ShowEast trade show in 2013. In May 2016, Lewis received the Thomas Alva Edison Innovation Award, given by the Edison Innovation Foundation.
