= Dorothy Dwan =

American actress (1906–81)

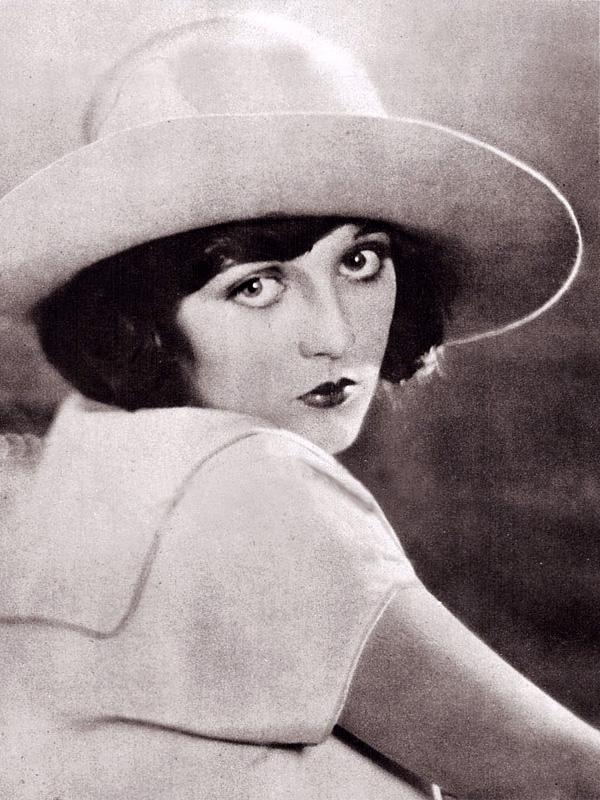
- Born: Dorothy Belle Ilgenfritz; April 26, 1906; Sedalia, Missouri, US
- Died: March 17, 1981 (aged 74); Ventura, California, US
- Occupation: Actress
- Years active: 1922–1930
- Spouses: Larry Semon (m. 1925; died 1928) Paul Northcutt Boggs Jr. (m. 1930; div. 1935)

Dorothy Dwan (born Dorothy Belle Ilgenfritz; April 26, 1906 – March 17, 1981) was an American film actress and columnist.

== Early years ==
Born Dorothy Belle Ilgenfritz in Sedalia, Missouri, Dwan was the daughter of Charles Melvin Ilgenfritz and Nancy Dorothy Wallace. Shortly after her mother's divorce and remarriage in approximately 1915, Dorothy was legally adopted by her stepfather George Hughes Smith. Eventually, the family moved to Philadelphia, where Dorothy attended Miss Hill's School, specializing in English and music.

== Career ==
After she appeared as an extra in films, Universal signed Dwan to a contract.

She was a WAMPAS Baby Star. She appeared in 40 films between 1922 and 1930, several of which were directed by her first husband, Larry Semon.

In 1928, Dwan moved from making films to acting on stage, signing with Henry Duffy to act in his Pacific Coast theaters.

After she left acting, Dwan worked as a columnist for Photoplay magazine.

== Personal life and death ==
Dwan married Semon on January 22, 1925. They were still wed when he died in 1928. She had one child, a son, Paul, from her second marriage to Paul Northcutt Boggs Jr. on May 23, 1930. They divorced in 1935. Dwan died in Ventura, California from lung cancer, aged 74.

== Partial filmography ==
- The Silent Vow (1922)
- The Enemy Sex (1924)
- Her Boy Friend (1924)
- Breed of the Border (1924)
- Kid Speed (1924)
- The Parasite (1925)
- Wizard of Oz (1925)
- The Perfect Clown (1925)
- Bashful Buccaneer (1925)
- Stop, Look and Listen (1926)
- The Great K & A Train Robbery (1926)
- The Call of the Klondike (1926)
- A Captain's Courage (1926)
- The Dangerous Dude (1926)
- Spuds (1927)
- McFadden's Flats (1927)
- Hills of Kentucky (1927)
- The Princess on Broadway (1927)
- The Land Beyond the Law (1927)
- Tumbling River (1927)
- Silver Valley (1927)
- Riders of the Dark (1928)
- Square Crooks (1928)
- Out with the Tide (1928)
- The Drifter (1929)
- The Peacock Fan (1929)
- The California Mail (1929)
- The Fighting Legion (1930)
