= Dolby 3D =

Marketing name

The technique's logo

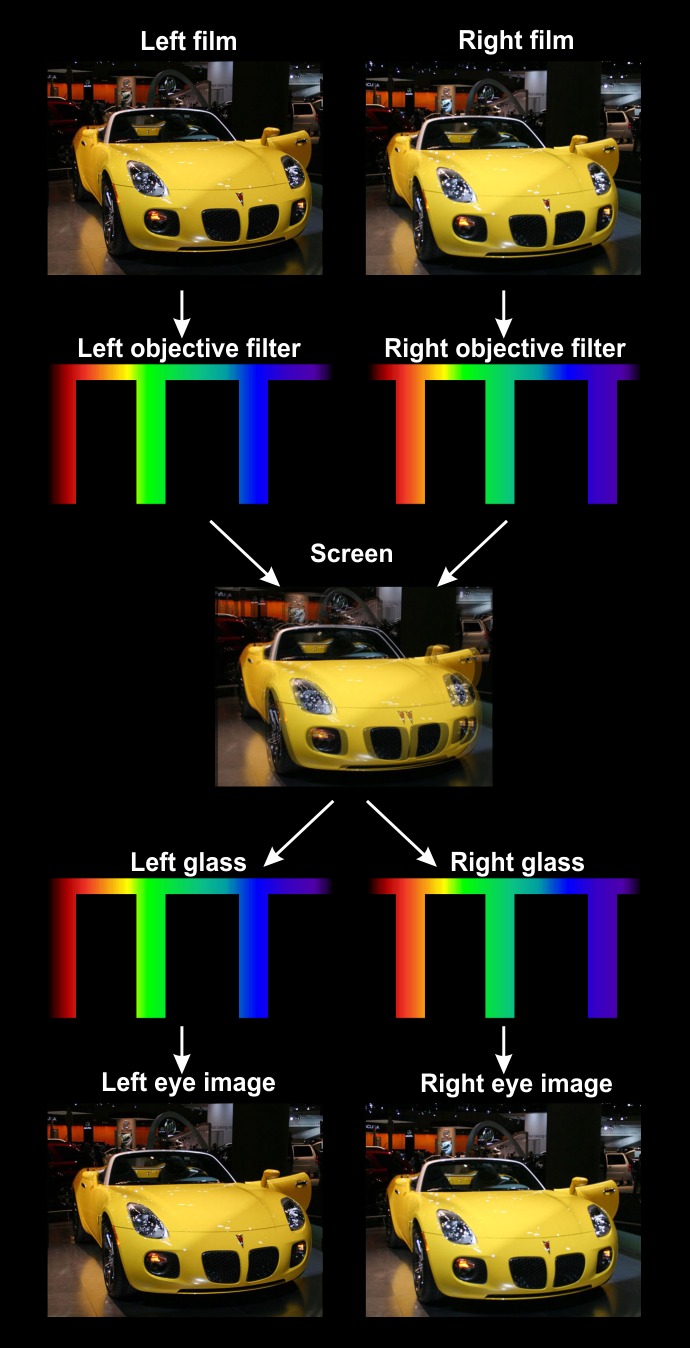
A visual representation of how Dolby 3D works

Dolby 3D (formerly known as Dolby 3D Digital Cinema) is a marketing name for a system from Dolby Laboratories, Inc. to show three-dimensional motion pictures in a digital cinema.

== Technology ==
Dolby 3D uses a Dolby Digital Cinema projector that can show both 2D and 3D films. For 3D presentations, additional filters are used in the projector, one filter each for the left eye and right eye. Each filter allows different frequencies of red, green, and blue light to pass through each of them. The filters are able to each produce a common color gamut but transmit light at different wavelengths. Glasses with complementary dichroic filters in the lenses are worn, which filter out either one or the other set of three light wavelengths. In this way, one projector can display the left and right stereoscopic images in an alternating cadence that, when wearing the glasses, is not visible to the guest.

In alternate forms one filter is placed in each of two projectors, both pointed at the same screen, one displaying the right eye image and one displaying the left eye image simultaneously. This method of stereoscopic projection is called wavelength multiplex visualization, and was created by Infitec. The dichroic filters in the Dolby 3D glasses are sometimes glass lenses and more expensive than the glasses technology used in circular polarization systems like RealD Cinema or linear polarization systems like Digital IMAX and are not considered disposable. However, an important benefit of Dolby 3D in comparison with RealD is that Dolby 3D works with conventional projection screens.

== Gallery ==
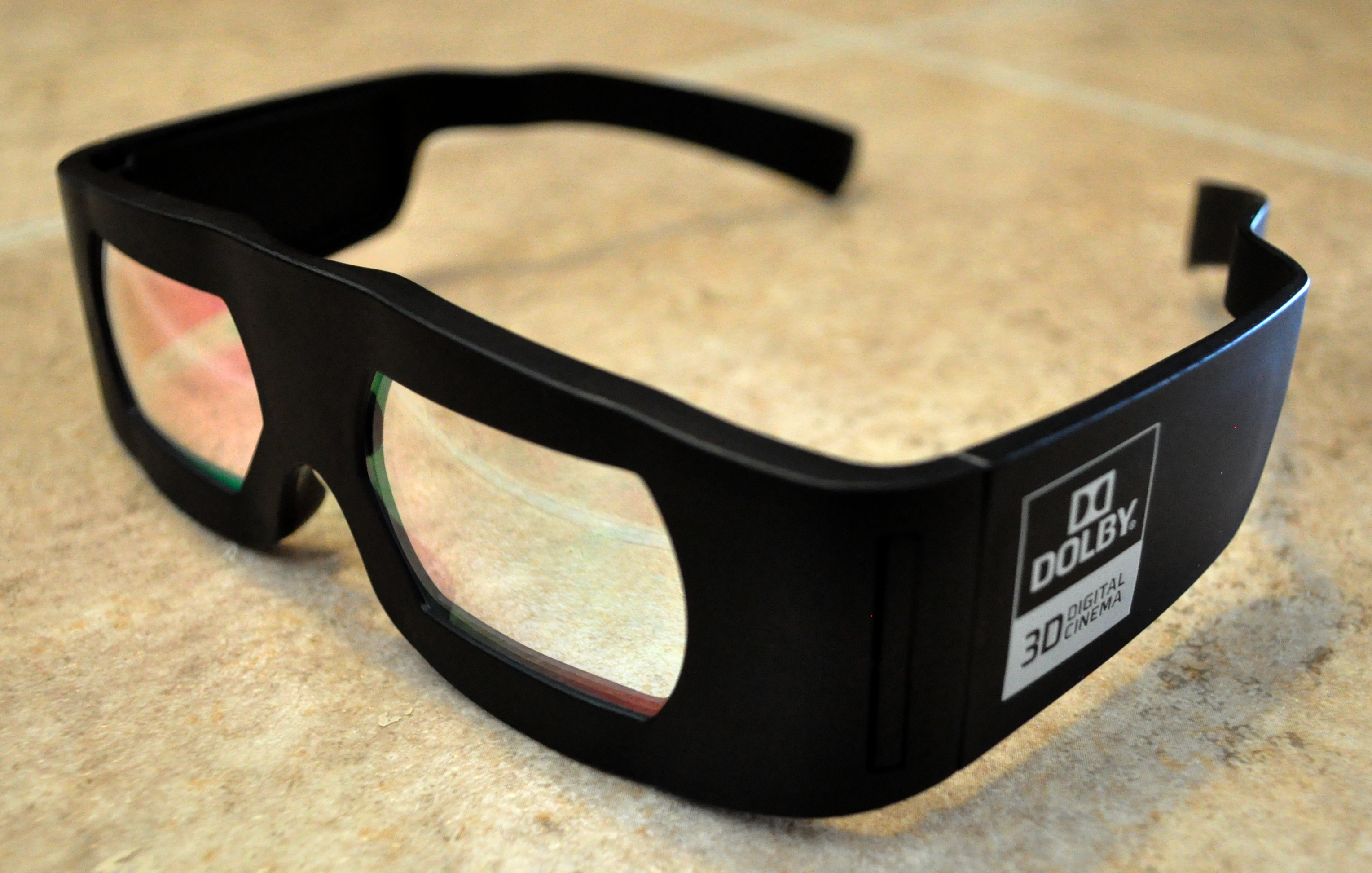
Dolby 3D glasses

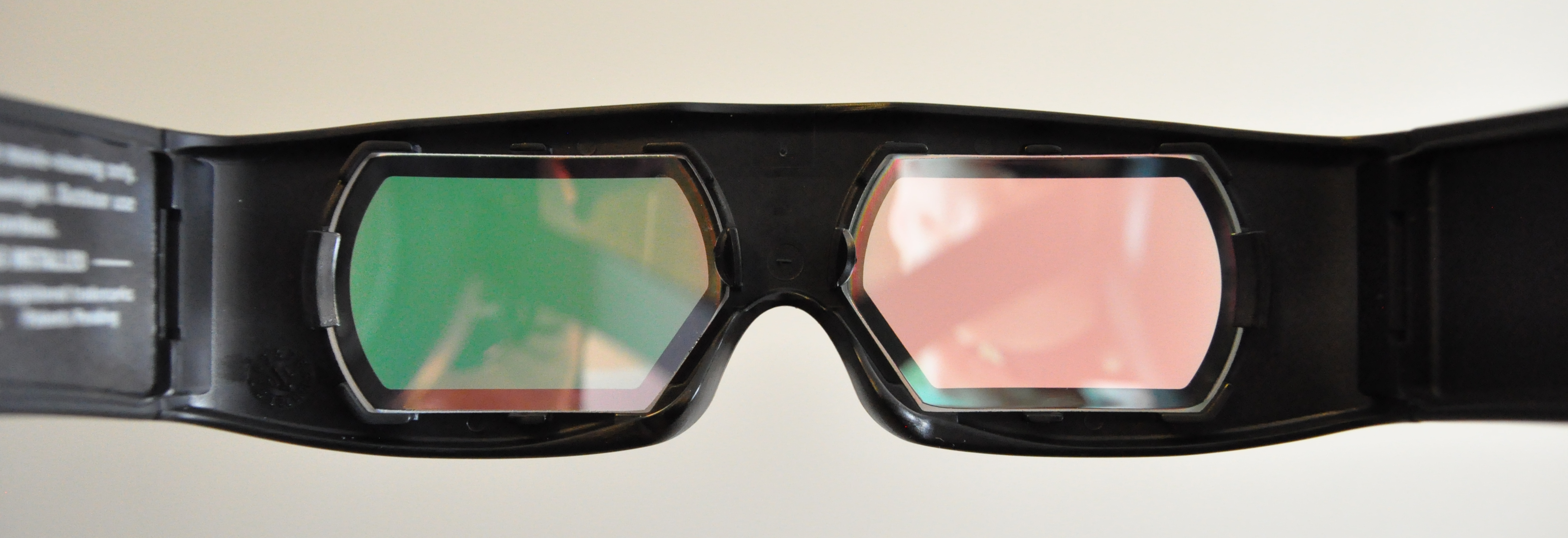
Dichroic lenses

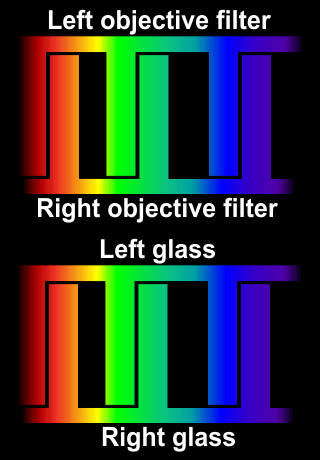
Color filter design of the Dolby 3D system
