= Silver screen =

Projection screen used in motion picture industry

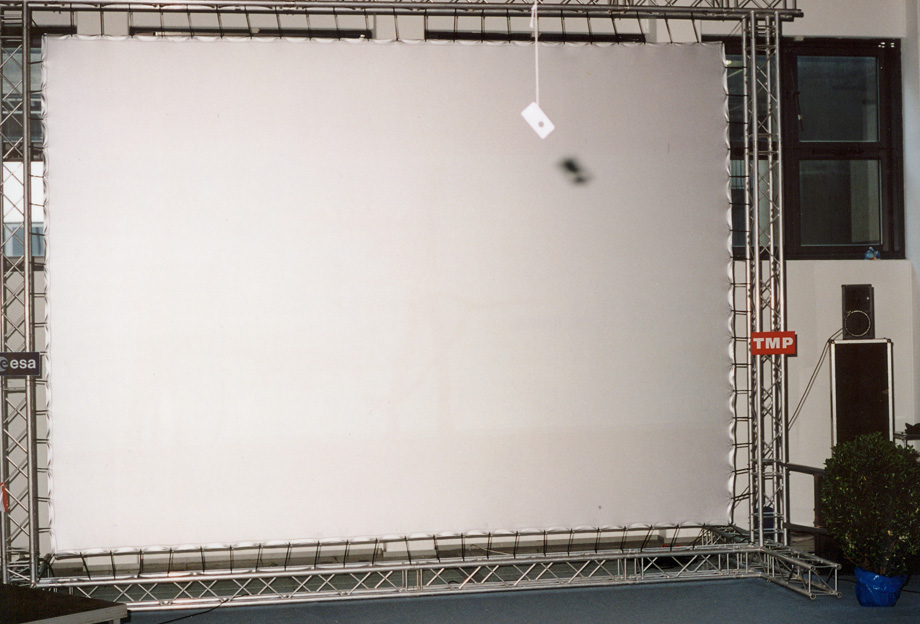
A silver screen on a frame.

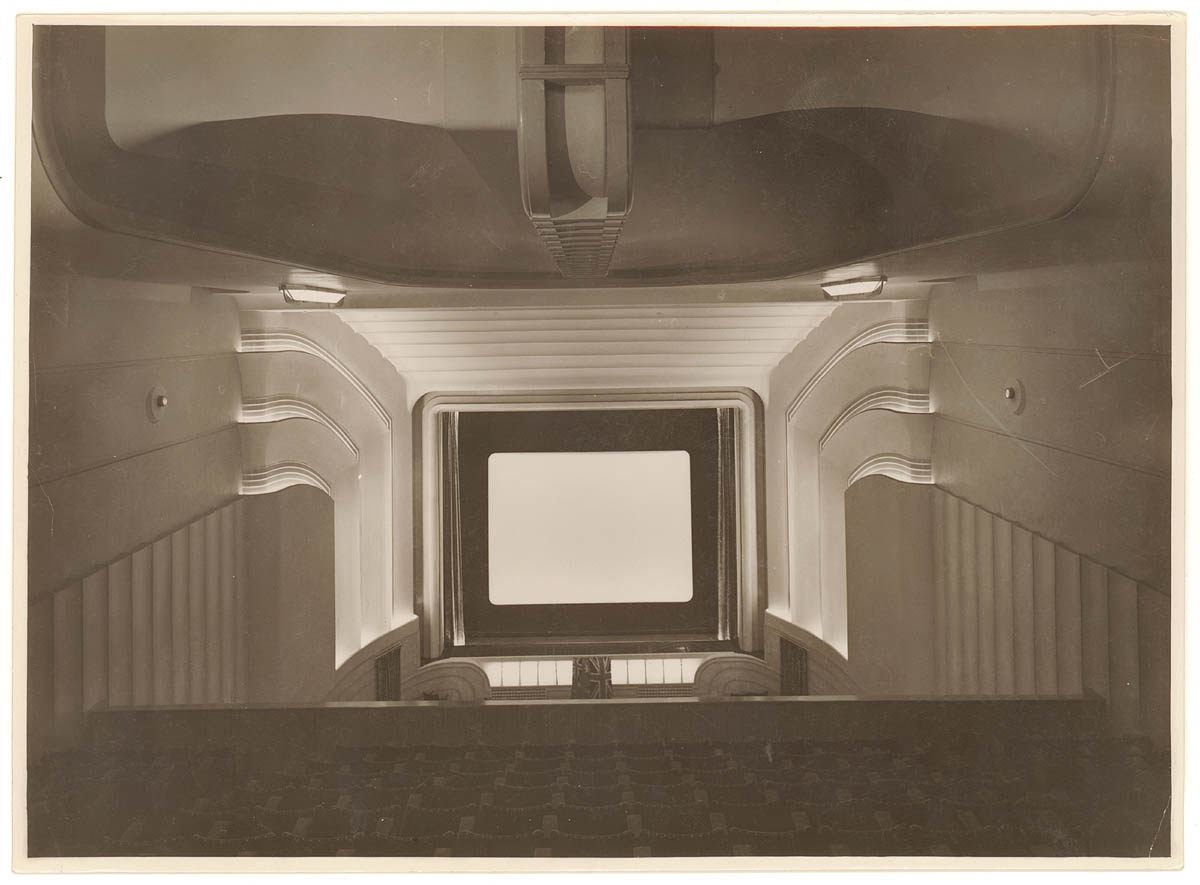
A silver screen as seen in Victory Theatre (Sydney) in the 1930s.

A silver screen, also known as a silver lenticular screen, is a type of projection screen that was popular in the early years of the motion picture industry and passed into popular usage as a metonym for the cinema industry. The term silver screen comes from the actual silver (or similarly reflective aluminium) content embedded in the material that made up the screen's highly reflective surface.

== History ==
There are descriptions of a silver screen being used in the presentation of films as early as 1897. Film exhibitor Arthur Cheetham used one for some of his later cinematograph Living Pictures presentations, "now shown on a new silver screen which brings the pictures out almost as well as electric light." The novelty of this screen was emphasised by Cheetham, and he later named his the Silvograph.

Reports mentioning silver screens don't appear in US papers until over a decade later. In 1909, the Lyric theatre in Smith St., New Jersey was "equipped with a new patent silver-coated screen". A 1910 article praises a new, silver screen installed at the Gem theatre in North Dakota, which is described as being "coated with aluminum or silver paint". As a result of this, "each picture stands out a great deal more distinctly than on the old screen."

The phrase's use as a metonym can be observed several years later. The New York Times reported on the "First National Motion Picture Exposition" which took place in 1916 and started with "a parade of the stars of the silver screen".

Akron, Ohio, projectionist Harry Coulter Williams invented the vinyl plastic Williams Perlite screen in 1947. He had started experimenting with creating an improved screen by "painting a stout cloth with silver paint" in 1925. The Williams Perlite was marketed as an all-purpose, tear-resistant screen that was installed in many major movie houses of the day, including the rapidly expanding theaters built by Warner Bros of nearby Youngstown, Ohio. Williams' silver-painted screens were adapted for CinemaScope, VistaVision, and early 3D movies. They were advertised as providing "a brighter picture at all angles" with "top reflectivity at direct viewing" and "extra diffusion for side seats and balcony."

Metallic screens increased in popularity during the 3D film boom that occurred in the 2000s to 2010s.

== Characteristics ==
Silver lenticular (vertically ridged) screens, which are made from a tightly woven fabric, either natural, such as silk, or a synthetic fiber, were excellent for use with low-power projector lamp heads and the monochromatic images that were a staple of early projected images. Other silver screens are made by taking normal matte sheets and adhering silver dust to them; the effect is the same.

True silver screens, however, provide narrower horizontal/vertical viewing angles compared to their more modern counterparts because of their inability to completely disperse light. In addition, a single projection source tends to over-saturate the center of the screen and leave the peripheries darker, depending on the position of the viewer and how well adjusted the lamp head is, a phenomenon known as hot-spotting. Due to these limitations and the continued innovation of screen materials, the use of silver screens in the general motion picture exhibition industry has mostly been phased out.

== Use in 3D projection ==
Silver lenticular screens, while no longer employed as the standard for motion picture projection, have come back into use as they are ideally suited for modern polarized 3D projection. The percentage of light reflected from a non-metallic (dielectric) surface varies strongly with the direction of polarization and the angle of incidence; this is not the case for an electric conductor such as a metal (as an illustration of this, sunlight reflected from a horizontal surface such as a reflective road surface or water is attenuated by polarized sunglasses relative to direct light; this is not the case if the light is reflected from a metallic surface). As many 3D technologies in use today depend upon maintaining the polarization of the images to be presented to each eye, the reflecting surface needs to be metallic rather than dielectric.

Additionally, the nature of polarized 3D projection requires the use of interposed filters, and the overall image is consequently less bright than if it were being normally projected. Silver lenticular screens help compensate by reflecting more light back than a "modern" screen would—the same purpose they originally served in the early days of motion pictures.

== Other screen types ==
Each of these screen types continues to enjoy widespread popularity for both home and business applications:

- Aluminized screen

Similar to a silver screen, but using aluminium to coat the surface. Used for 3D films for the same reason as silver screens.

- Pearlescent screen

Similar to a silver screen, this screen has narrow viewing angles and a higher gain (the measure of reflected light), but it does suffer from color-shifts to red and a tendency to hot spot.

- Glass-beaded screen

This screen type also has a higher gain; however, the nature of its construction results in limited viewing angles and a loss of resolution since glass-beaded screens are retro-reflective, that is, their reflection is directed back toward the light source. The glass-beaded surface can develop noticeable dark spots with age or mishandling as the beads can wear off. It is popular in the amateur market.

- Gray screen

Also known as a high contrast screen, because its purpose is to boost contrast on projectors in viewing rooms that are not entirely dark, as the gray screen absorbs ambient light that strikes it better than a white screen does. Essentially, the screen only reflects the specific shades of red, green, and blue output by a trichromatic video projector, and absorbs the remainder. Therefore, the projected image is reflected normally, but other light is not. In doing so, the black level on the screen is maintained. Mostly used with digital projectors in non-commercial settings.

- Matte white screen

This screen provides the widest viewing angles while producing no glare and no hot spotting. These characteristics have made it the most common variety of screen currently produced and has allowed it to become the entertainment industry's standard.
