= MasterImage 3D =

American stereoscopic 3D manufacturing company

- Founded: 2004
- Founder: Younghoon Lee
- Headquarters: Hollywood, California
- Products: 3D Cinema Systems, 3D Eyewear, 3D Glasses-free Displays for Smartphones and Tablets
- Website: masterimage3d.com

MasterImage 3D is a company that develops stereoscopic 3D systems for theaters, and auto-stereoscopic 3D displays for mobile devices.

== 3D Cinema Technology ==
The MasterImage 3D MI-CLARITY3D system for cinemas is a polarized 3D system that is based on the projector presenting a spinning polarized filter, which contains alternating segments of circularly polarized material. Mounted in front of the projector lens, this filter is synchronized to the projected images, giving each frame a polarization perpendicular to the previous one, which can be viewed with polarized 3D glasses. The filter wheel can be lowered out of the lens' path for non-3D material. It has been noted that an earlier version of the spinning polarized filter malfunctioned, but the problem has been addressed with an updated replacement filter which was supplied to all theaters using the system. MasterImage 3D offers different types of 3D cinema technology (including those based on a polarized filter disc, as well as solid-state liquid crystal), based on different cinema configurations. The company also produces passive 3D eyewear that is optically matched to their 3D systems.

== Auto-Stereoscopic Cell-Matrix 3D Technology ==
MasterImage 3D also produces auto-stereoscopic displays for smartphones and tablets, which allow devices to present 3D images without the need for glasses. MasterImage 3D provides screens ranging from 4.3 inches to 10.1 inches. They achieve the effect through its patented Cell-Matrix Parallax Barrier technology, which uses a cell-gap approach that enables landscape and portrait modes, provides a 10 degree viewing angle, and reduces the Moire pattern that causes ghosting. MasterImage 3D's auto-stereoscopic display was used in one of the world's first glasses-free 3D mobile phones, the Hitachi Wooo, available in Japan in 2009. Another device featuring the MasterImage 3D Cell-Matrix 3D display, the Micromax A115 Canvas 3D, was released in April 2013.

MasterImage 3D Cell-Matrix 3D Logo
