= Phantogram =

Phantogram may refer to:

- Phantogram (band)
- Phantogram (optical illusion)

== See also ==
- Phantagram South Korean video game maker
