= 2D plus Delta =

Method of encoding 3D images listed as a part of MPEG2 and MPEG4 standards

2D Plus Delta (also called 2D+Delta) is a method of encoding a 3D image and is listed as a part of MPEG2 and MPEG4 standards, specifically on the H.264 implementation of the Multiview Video Coding extension. This technology originally started as a proprietary method for Stereoscopic Video Coding and content deployment that utilizes the left or right channel as the 2D version and the optimized difference or disparity (Delta) between that image channel view and a second eye image view is injected into the video stream as user data, secondary stream, independent stream, enhancement layer or NALu for deployment. The Delta data can be either a spatial stereo disparity, temporal predictive, bidirectional, or optimized motion compensation.

== Overview ==
The technology was originally filed for world-wide intellectual property protection via WIPO in 2003. The patent statements were submitted to ISO in 2007, and listed as part of the MVC standard in 2008. The technology is now an open standard that is available for licensing and usage.

The MVC initiative was started in June 2006.

The resulting video stream has the following characteristics:

- Contains the full information to reconstruct the Left and Right stereoscopic views in full resolution per eye
- Requires an additional average bandwidth ranging from 30% to 60% regarding a 2D only stream depending on the encoding implementation
- Can be deployed over existing pipelines, starting from 16 Mbit/s for 1080p@60fps per eye
- One single video stream services both: 3D viewers and 2D Legacy users
- Can be seamlessly decoded by 2D legacy decoders in full 2D HD without the need for any change or additional hardware

2D Plus Delta has been listed at ISO/ITU/IEC/MPEG2/MPEG4/MVC initiatives.

- MPEG4 ISO/IEC 14496-10:2009
- MPEG4 ISO/IEC 14496-10:2008 - 07
- MPEG4 ISO/IEC 14496-10:2008/FDAmd 1 - 01
- MPEG4 ISO/IEC 14496-10:2008/FDAmd 1 - 02
- MPEG4 ISO/IEC 14496-15:2004/CD Amd 3 - 01
- MPEG4 ISO/IEC 14496-15:2004/CD Amd 3 - 02
- MPEG4 ISO/IEC 14496-4:2004/CD Amd 38 - 01
- MPEG4 ISO/IEC 14496-4:2004/CD Amd 38 - 02
- MPEG4 ISO/IEC 14496-5:2001/CD Amd 15 - 01
- MPEG4 ISO/IEC 14496-5:2001/CD Amd 15 - 02
- MPEG2 ISO/IEC 13818-1:2007/CD Amd 4 - 01
- MPEG2 ISO/IEC 13818-1:2007/CD Amd 4 - 02
- MPEG4 ISO/IEC 14496-10:2008 - 06
- MPEG4 ISO/IEC 14496-10:2008 - 07

There are two ways for stereoscopic 3D deployment of content to the home (3D television):

1. Frame compatible: Pixel subsampling like Side by Side, Checkerboard, Quincunx and Color shifting like Anaglyph
2. Enhanced Video stream Coding: 2D+Delta/MVC and 2D plus depth

== See also ==
- 2D-plus-depth
- Multiview Video Coding
- Stereoscopic
- Anaglyph
- TDVision
- 3DTV
