= ColorCode 3-D =

Anaglyph 3D stereoscopic viewing system

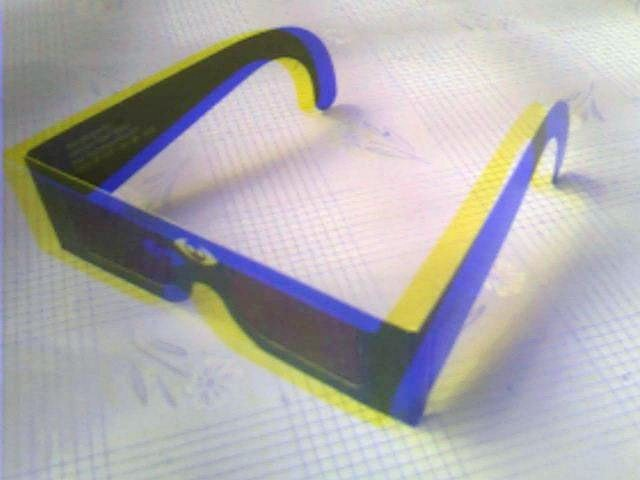
A simple 3-D Amber-Blue snapshot of the ColorCode 3-D glasses

ColorCode 3-D is a color based stereoscopic viewing system deployed in the 2000s that uses amber and blue filters. It is easily confused with anaglyph 3D but differs in a way that it is not using primary colors that anaglyphs do. It is intended to provide the perception of nearly full-color viewing with existing television, digital and print mediums. Danish company ColorCode 3-D ApS distributed the system. Today Swedish company Ogon AB is delivering the successor of the ColorCode 3-D System, the A3D™ System.

== Technology ==
One eye (left, amber filter) receives the cross-spectrum color information and one eye (right, blue filter) sees a monochrome image designed to give the depth effect. The human brain ties both images together.

Images viewed without filters will tend to exhibit light-blue and yellow horizontal fringing. The backwards compatible 2-D viewing experience for viewers not wearing glasses is improved, generally being better than previous red and green anaglyph imaging systems, and further improved by the use of digital post-processing to minimize fringing. The displayed hues and intensity can be subtly adjusted to further improve the perceived 2-D image, with problems only generally found in the case of extreme blue.

The blue filter is centered on 450 nm and the amber filter lets in light at wavelengths at above 500 nm. Wide-spectrum color is possible because the amber filter lets through light across most wavelengths in the spectrum.

The ColorCode 3-D patent has expired in 2020. In 2017, Ogon introduced the new A3D-EDR process. EDR stands for Extended Dynamic Range. The new system continues to use amber-blue glasses, but is based on an advanced encoding process that is optimized for modern 4K HDR displays. In contrast to the legacy ColorCode 3-D process, the color dynamic range is higher (16-bit color reproduction instead of 8-bit color reproduction).

== Notable uses ==
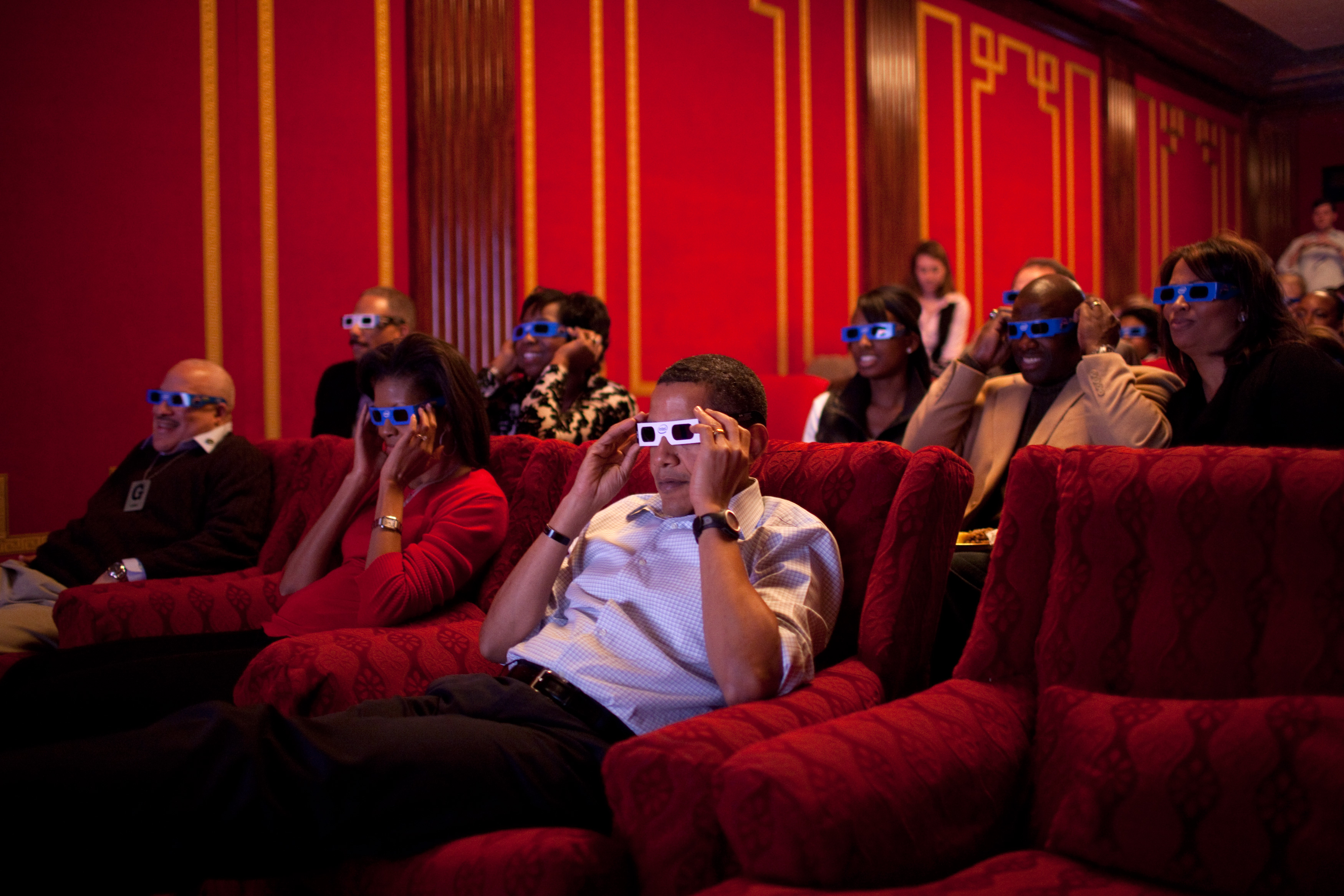
Barack and Michelle Obama, along with their party, watch the commercials during Super Bowl XLIII in the White House theater using ColorCode 3-D.

The technology premiered with a ColorCode 3-D release of nWave Pictures' Encounter in the Third Dimension, which was the first of a series of ColorCode 3-D releases distributed to IMAX theaters worldwide. In the United Kingdom, television station Channel 4 commenced broadcasting a series of programmes encoded using the system during the week of 16 November 2009. Previously the system had been used in the United States for an "all 3-D advertisement" during the 2009 Super Bowl on NBC for SoBe, the animated film Monsters vs. Aliens, and an advertisement for the television series Chuck in which the full episode the following night used the format.

In print, Time Inc. used ColorCode 3-D in five of their magazines (Time, People, Sports Illustrated, Entertainment Weekly, and Fortune) to display 3D images when they published a series of articles about the new "3-D revolution" in April 2009.

== Viewing comfort ==
ColorCode 3-D, like various other stereoscopic 3D technologies, does reduce the overall brightness of the viewed image. Also, improperly calibrated displays can cause image ghosting.
