= Anaglyph 3D =

Method of representing images in 3D

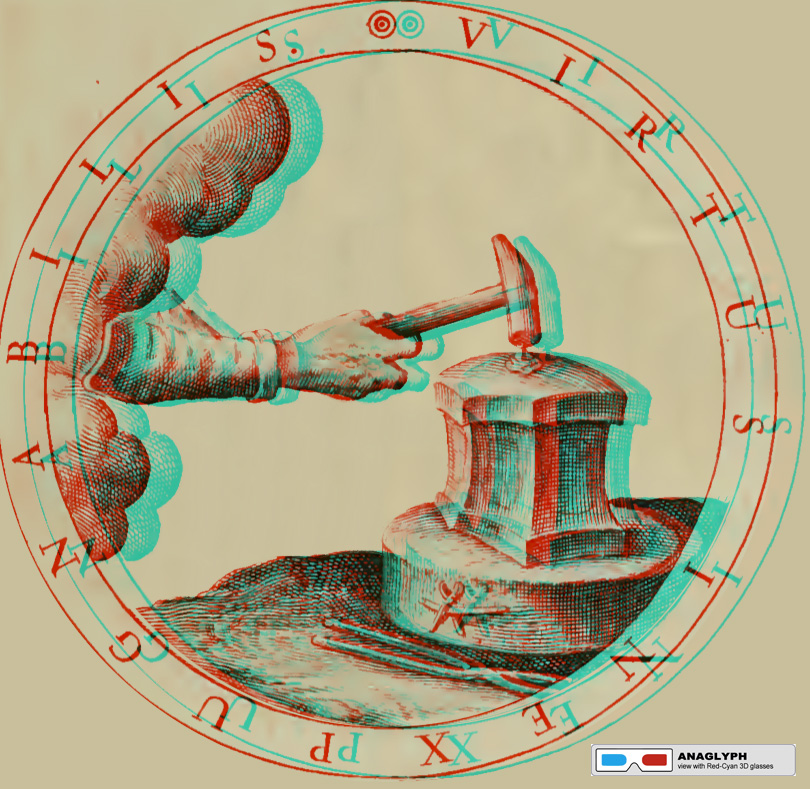
A simple red-cyan anaglyph image 3D red cyan glasses are recommended to view this image correctly.

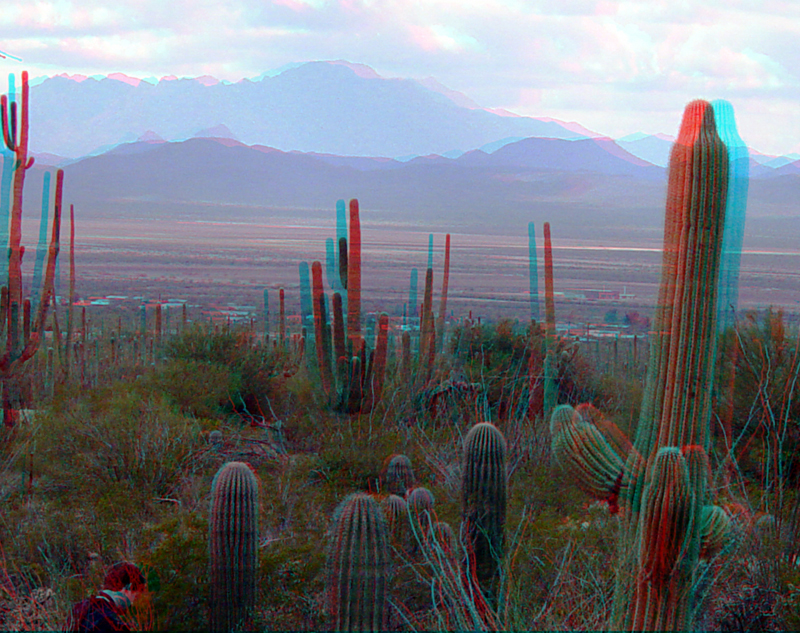
Anaglyph of Saguaro National Park at dusk 3D red cyan glasses are recommended to view this image correctly.

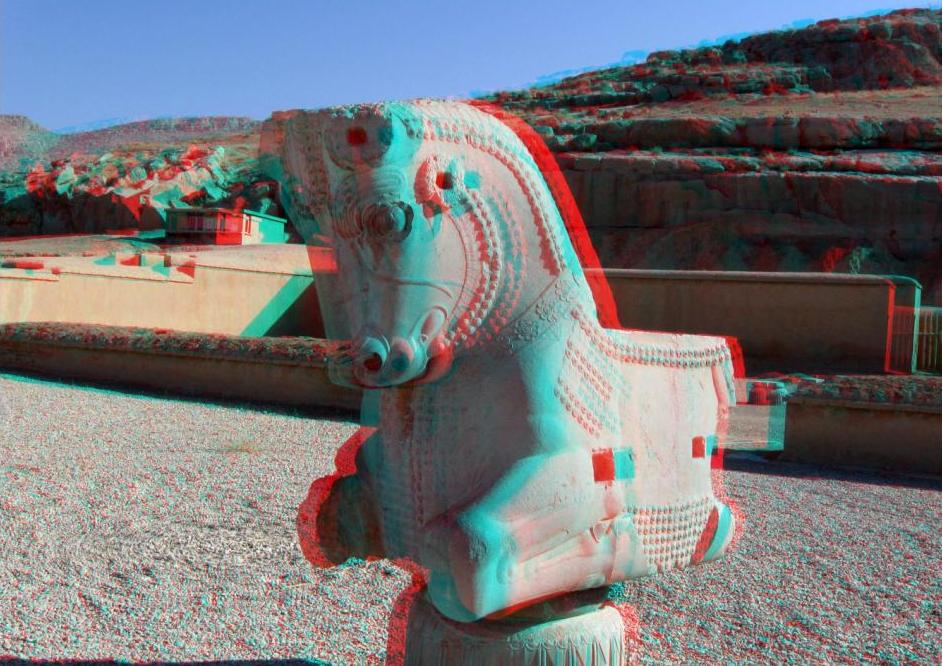
Anaglyph of a column head in Persepolis, Iran 3D red cyan glasses are recommended to view this image correctly.

An image demonstrating binocular rivalry. If you view the image with red-cyan 3D glasses, the text will alternate between Red and Blue. 3D red cyan glasses are recommended to view this image correctly.

Anaglyph 3D is a stereoscopic 3D effect achieved by overlaying images in different colors with corresponding filters for each eye. The colors are usually chromatically opposite — most typically red and cyan.

== History ==
The oldest known description of anaglyph images was written in August 1853 by W. Rollmann in Stargard and described his "Farbenstereoscope" (color stereoscope). He had the best results when viewing a yellow/blue drawing with red/blue glasses. Rollmann found that with a red/blue drawing the red lines were not as distinct as yellow lines when viewed through the blue glass.

In 1858, in France, Joseph D'Almeida delivered a report to l'Académie des sciences describing how to project three-dimensional magic lantern slide shows using red and green filters to an audience wearing red and green goggles. Subsequently, he was credited with being responsible for the first realization of 3D images using anaglyphs.

Louis Ducos du Hauron produced the first printed anaglyphs in 1891. This process consisted of printing the two negatives which form a stereoscopic photograph onto the same paper, one in blue (or green), one in red. The viewer would then use colored glasses with red for the left eye and blue or green for the right eye. The left eye would see the blue image which would appear black, while it would not see the red; similarly the right eye would see the red image, which would also register as black. Thus, a three-dimensional image would result.

William Friese-Green created the first three-dimensional anaglyphic motion pictures in 1889, which were publicly exhibited in 1893. 3-D films enjoyed something of a boom in the 1920s. As late as 1954, films such as Creature from the Black Lagoon remained very successful. Originally shot and exhibited using the polarized 3D system, Creature from the Black Lagoon was successfully re-issued at a later date in an anaglyph format so it could be shown in cinemas without the need for special equipment.

The American photographic artist Claudia Kunin began using this rendering technique to produce fine art prints in 2010.

The shortened form "3-D" was in use in specialized technical literature by the early 1950s, and its popularization is generally associated with that decade. In 1953, anaglyph images began appearing sporadically in newspapers, magazines, and comic books.

== Production ==
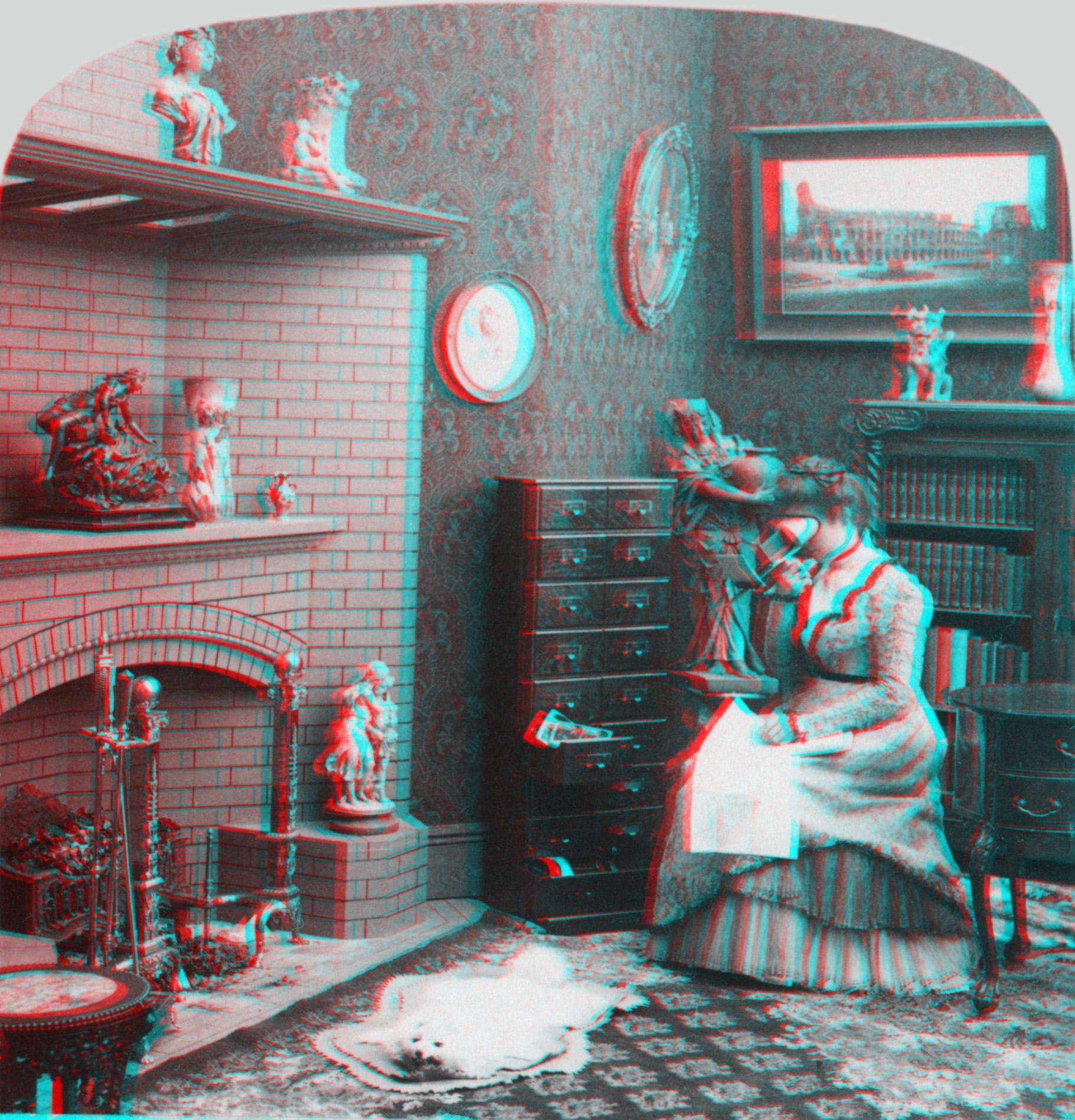
Stereoscopic monochrome image anaglyphed for red (left eye) and cyan (right eye) filters 3D red cyan glasses are recommended to view this image correctly.

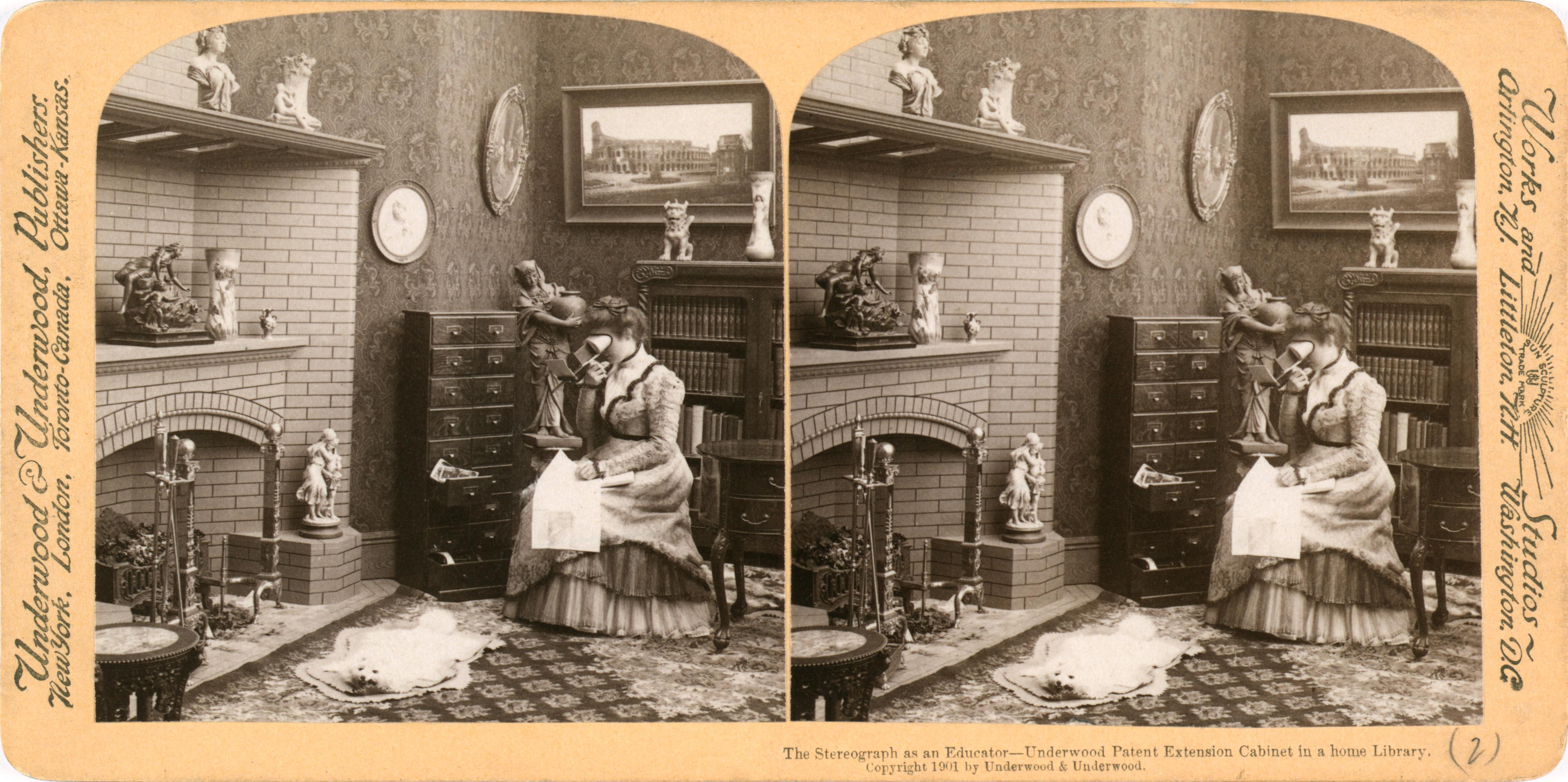
Stereogram source image for the anaglyph above

=== Anaglyph from stereoscopic pairs ===
A stereoscopic pair is a pair of images from slightly different perspectives captured at the same time. Objects closer to the cameras have greater differences in appearance and position within the image frames than objects farther from the camera.

Historically, cameras captured two black-and-white images from the perspective of the left and right eyes, which were projected or printed together as a single image, one view through a red filter and the other side through a contrasting color such as blue or green or cyan. One may now typically use an image processing computer program to simulate the effect of using color filters, using as a source image a pair of either color or monochrome images. This is called channel mixing, a kind of digital compositing or blending.

In the 1970s, filmmaker Stephen Gibson filmed direct anaglyph blaxploitation and adult films. His "Deep Vision" system replaced the original camera lens with two color-filtered lenses focused on the same film frame. In the 1980s, Gibson patented his mechanism.

Many computer graphics programs provide the basic tools (typically layering and adjustments to individual color channels for color filtering) required to prepare anaglyphs from stereoscopic pairs. In a simple workflow, the left eye image is filtered to remove blue and green, which is achieved by multiplying each pixel in the left image by solid red (#FF0000). The right eye image is filtered to remove red, by multiplying its pixels by solid cyan (#00FFFF). The two images are usually positioned in the compositing phase with close overlay registration of the main subject, and are then combined using an additive blend mode. Plugins for some of these programs, as well as dedicated anaglyph-preparation programs, are available to automate the process and require the user to choose only a few basic settings.

=== Stereoscopic conversion (single 2D image to 3D) ===
There also exist methods for making anaglyphs using only one image, a process called stereo conversion. In one, individual elements of a picture are horizontally offset in one layer by differing amounts with elements offset further having greater apparent changes in depth (either forward or back depending on whether the offset is to the left or right). This produces images that tend to look like elements are flat standees arranged at various distances from the viewer similar to cartoon images in a View-Master.

A more sophisticated method involves use of a depth map (a false color image where color indicates distance, for example, a grayscale depth map could have lighter indicate an object closer to the viewer and darker indicate an object further away). As for preparing anaglyphs from stereoscopic pairs, stand-alone software and plug-ins for some graphics apps exist which automate production of anaglyphs (and stereograms) from a single image or from an image and its corresponding depth map.

As well as fully automatic methods of calculating depth maps (which may be more or less successful), depth maps can be drawn entirely by hand. Also developed are methods of producing depth maps from sparse or less accurate depth maps. A sparse depth map is a depth map consisting of only a relatively few lines or areas which guides the production of the full depth map. Use of a sparse depth map can help overcome auto-generation limitations. For example, if a depth finding algorithm takes cues from image brightness an area of shadow in the foreground may be incorrectly assigned as background. This misassignment is overcome by assigning the shaded area a close value in the sparse depth map.

== Mechanics ==
Viewing anaglyphs through spectrally opposed glasses or gel filters enables each eye to see independent left and right images from within a single anaglyphic image. Red-cyan filters can be employed because our vision processing systems use red and cyan comparisons, as well as blue and yellow, to determine the color and contours of objects.

In a red-cyan anaglyph, the eye viewing through the red filter sees red within the anaglyph as white, and the cyan within the anaglyph as black. The eye viewing through the cyan filter perceives the opposite.

Actual black or white in the anaglyph display, being void of color, are perceived the same by each eye. The brain blends the red and cyan-channeled images much as it does in regular binocular viewing, but due to the color filtering only green and blue are strongly perceived by the eye behind the cyan filter while red is blocked by that filter.

A red filter allows red light to pass and blocks blue and green, so a red object appears bright through the red lens but dark through cyan. Conversely, colors composed of blue and green (cyan) pass through the cyan filter and are not seen by the red filter. In this way, each eye receives separate information for depth perception and the brain integrates the two views.

== Types ==
=== Complementary color ===
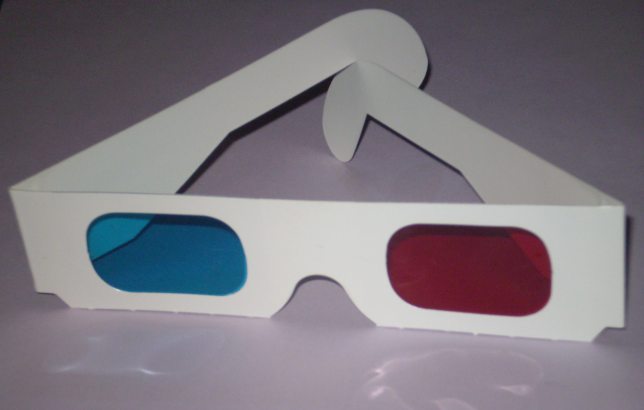
Paper anaglyph filters produce an acceptable image at low cost and are suitable for inclusion in magazines.

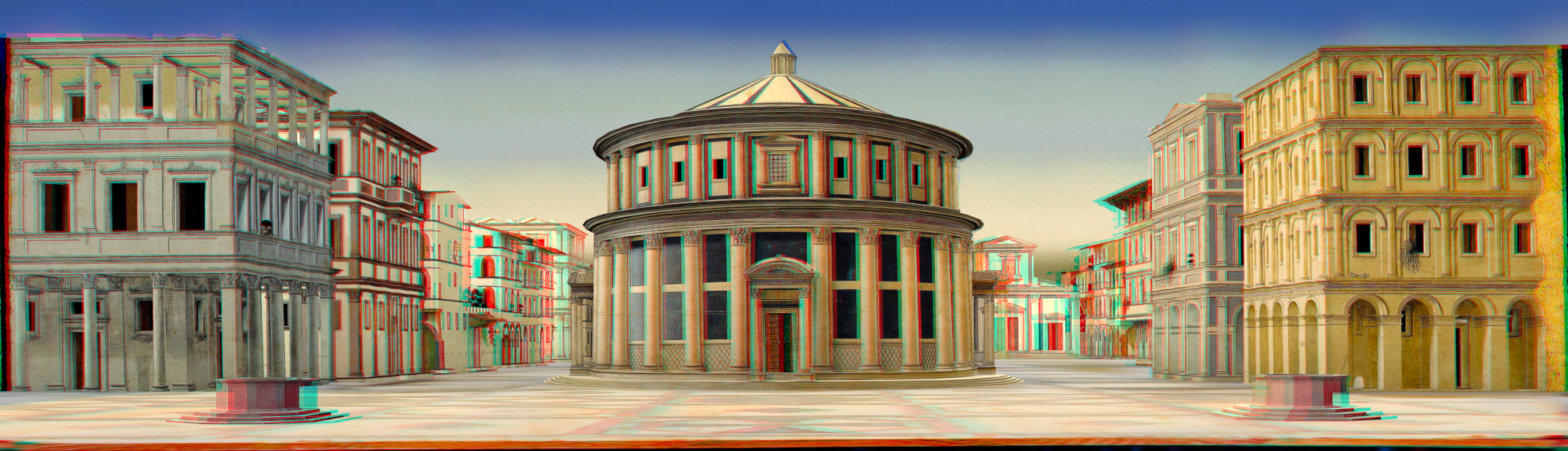
Piero della Francesca, Ideal City in an Anaglyph version 3D red cyan glasses are recommended to view this image correctly.

Complementary color anaglyphs employ one of a pair of complementary color filters for each eye. The most common color filters used are red and cyan. Employing tristimulus theory, the eye is sensitive to three primary colors: red, green, and blue. The red filter admits only red, while the cyan filter blocks red, passing blue and green (the combination of blue and green is perceived as cyan). If a paper viewer containing red and cyan filters is folded so that light passes through both, the image will appear black. Another recently introduced form employs blue and yellow filters. (Yellow is the color perceived when both red and green light passes through the filter.)

Anaglyph images have seen a resurgence since the early 2000s because of the presentation of images on the Internet. Where traditionally, this has been a largely black & white format, recent digital camera and processing advances have brought very acceptable color images to the internet and DVD field. With the online availability of low cost paper glasses with improved red-cyan filters, and plastic framed glasses of increasing quality, the field of 3D imaging is growing quickly. Scientific images where depth perception is useful include, for instance, the presentation of complex multi-dimensional data sets and stereographic images of the surface of Mars. With the recent release of 3D DVDs, they are more commonly being used for entertainment. Anaglyph images are much easier to view than either parallel sighting or crossed eye stereograms, although these types offer more bright and accurate color rendering, especially in the red component, which is commonly muted or desaturated with even the best color anaglyphs. Also, extended use of the anaglyph glasses can cause discomfort, and the afterimage caused by the colors of the glasses may temporarily affect the viewer's visual perception of real-life objects. In the mid-2000s, cross-view prismatic glasses with adjustable masking have appeared, offering a wider image on modern HD video and computer monitors. A compensating technique, commonly known as Anachrome, uses a slightly more transparent cyan filter in the patented glasses associated with the technique. Processing reconfigures the typical anaglyph image to have less parallax to obtain a more useful image when viewed without filters.

=== Compensating focus diopter glasses for red-cyan method ===
Simple sheet or uncorrected molded glasses do not compensate for the 250 nanometer difference in the wavelengths of the red-cyan filters. With simple glasses, the red filter image can be blurry when viewing a close computer screen or printed image since the retinal focus differs from the cyan filtered image, which dominates the eyes' focusing. Better quality molded plastic glasses employ different diopter strengths in each lens to compensate for this. The direct view focus on computer monitors has been recently improved by manufacturers providing secondary paired lenses, fitted and attached inside the red-cyan primary filters of some high-end anaglyph glasses. They are used where very high resolution is required, including science, stereo macros, and animation studio applications. They use carefully balanced cyan (blue-green) acrylic lenses, which pass a minute percentage of red to improve skin tone perception. Simple red/blue glasses work well with black and white, but the blue filter is unsuitable for human skin in color.

=== (ACB) 3-D ===
(ACB), which stands for “Anaglyphic Contrast Balance”, is a patented anaglyphic production method by Studio 555. Retinal rivalry of color contrasts within the color channels of anaglyph images is addressed.

Contrasts and details from the stereoscopic pair are maintained and re-presented for view within the anaglyph image. The (ACB) method of balancing the color contrasts within the stereoscopic pair enables a stable view of contrast details, thus eliminating retinal rivalry. The process is available for red/cyan color channels but may use any of the opposing color channel combinations. As with all stereoscopic anaglyphic systems, screen or print, the display color should be RGB accurate and the viewing gels should match the color channels to prevent double imaging. The basic (ACB) method adjusts red, green and blue, but adjusting all six color primaries is preferred.

The effectiveness of the (ACB) process is proven with the inclusion of primary color charts within a stereoscopic pair. A contrast-balanced view of the stereoscopic pair and color charts is evident in the resulting (ACB) processed anaglyph image. The (ACB) process also enables black and white (monochromatic) anaglyphs with contrast balance.

Where full color to each eye is enabled via alternating color channels and color-alternating viewing filters, (ACB) prevents shimmer from pure-colored objects within the modulating image. Vertical and diagonal parallax is enabled with concurrent use of a horizontally oriented lenticular or parallax barrier screen. This enables a Quadrascopic full color holographic effect from a monitor.

=== ColorCode 3-D ===
ColorCode 3-D was deployed in the 2000s and uses amber and blue filters. It is intended to provide the perception of nearly full color viewing (particularly within the RG color space) with existing television and paint mediums. One eye (left, amber filter) receives the cross-spectrum color information and one eye (right, blue filter) sees a monochrome image designed to give the depth effect. The human brain ties both images together.

Images viewed without filters will tend to exhibit light-blue and yellow horizontal fringing. The backwards compatible 2D viewing experience for viewers not wearing glasses is improved, generally being better than previous red and green anaglyph imaging systems, and further improved by the use of digital post-processing to minimize fringing. The displayed hues and intensity can be subtly adjusted to further improve the perceived 2D image, with problems only generally found in the case of extreme blue.

The blue filter is centered around 450 nm and the amber filter lets in light at wavelengths at above 500 nm. Wide spectrum color is possible because the amber filter lets through light across most wavelengths in spectrum and even has a small leakage of the blue color spectrum. When presented the original left and right images are run through the ColorCode 3-D encoding process to generate one single ColorCode 3-D encoded image.

In the United Kingdom, television station Channel 4 commenced broadcasting a series of programs encoded using the system during the week of November 16, 2009. Previously the system had been used in the United States for an "all 3-D advertisement" during the 2009 Super Bowl for SoBe, Monsters vs. Aliens animated movie and an advertisement for the Chuck television series in which the full episode the following night used the format.

=== Inficolor 3D ===
Developed by TriOviz, Inficolor 3D is a patent pending stereoscopic system, first demonstrated at the International Broadcasting Convention in 2007 and deployed in 2010. It works with traditional 2D flat panels and HDTV sets and uses expensive glasses with complex color filters and dedicated image processing that allow natural color perception with a 3D experience. This is achieved through having the left image using the green channel only and the right using the red and blue channels with some added post processing, which the brain then combines the two images to produce a nearly full color experience. When observed without glasses, some slight doubling can be noticed in the background of the action which allows watching the movie or the video game in 2D without the glasses. This is not possible with traditional brute force anaglyphic systems.

Inficolor 3D is a part of TriOviz for Games Technology, developed in partnership with TriOviz Labs and Darkworks Studio. It works with Sony PlayStation 3 (Official PlayStation 3 Tools & Middleware Licensee Program) and Microsoft Xbox 360 consoles as well as PC. TriOviz for Games Technology was showcased at Electronic Entertainment Expo 2010 by Mark Rein (vice-president of Epic Games) as a 3D tech demo running on an Xbox 360 with Gears of War 2. In October 2010 this technology was officially integrated in Unreal Engine 3, the computer game engine developed by Epic Games.

Stereoscopic 3D visualization video of the surface of a human brain 3D red cyan glasses are recommended to view this image correctly.

Video games equipped with TriOviz for Games Technology are: Batman Arkham Asylum: Game of the Year Edition for PS3 and Xbox 360 (March 2010), Enslaved: Odyssey to the West + DLC Pigsy's Perfect 10 for PS3 and Xbox 360 (Nov. 2010), Thor: God of Thunder for PS3 and Xbox 360 (May 2011), Green Lantern: Rise of the Manhunters for PS3 and Xbox 360 (June 2011), Captain America: Super Soldier for PS3 and Xbox 360 (July 2011). Gears of War 3 for Xbox 360 (September 2011), Batman: Arkham City for PS3 and Xbox 360 (October 2011), Assassin's Creed: Revelations for PS3 and Xbox 360 (November 2011), and Assassin's Creed III for Wii U (November 2012). The first DVD/Blu-ray including Inficolor 3D Tech is: Battle for Terra 3D (published in France by Pathé & Studio 37 - 2010).

=== Anachrome red/cyan filters ===
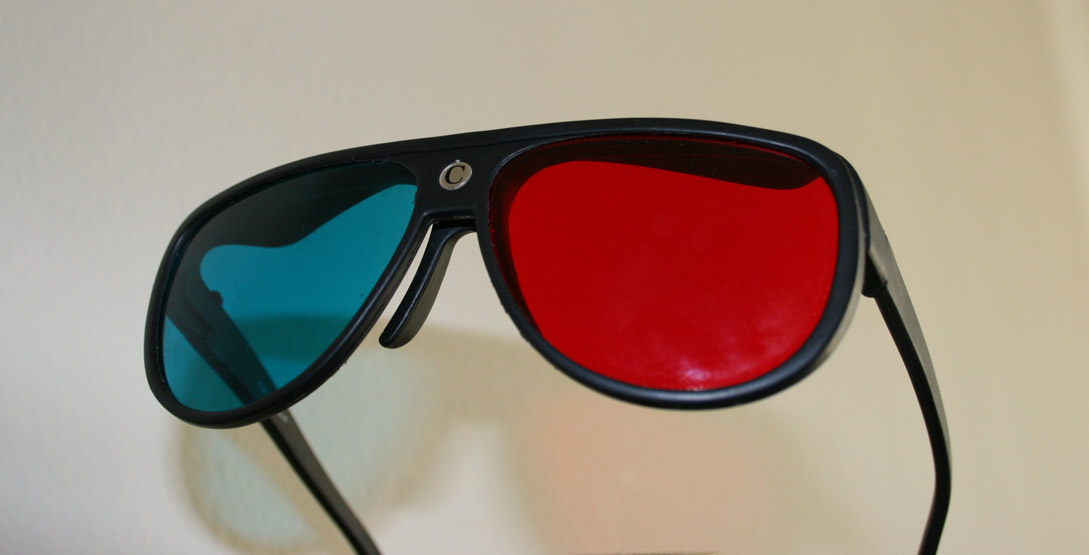
Anachrome glasses

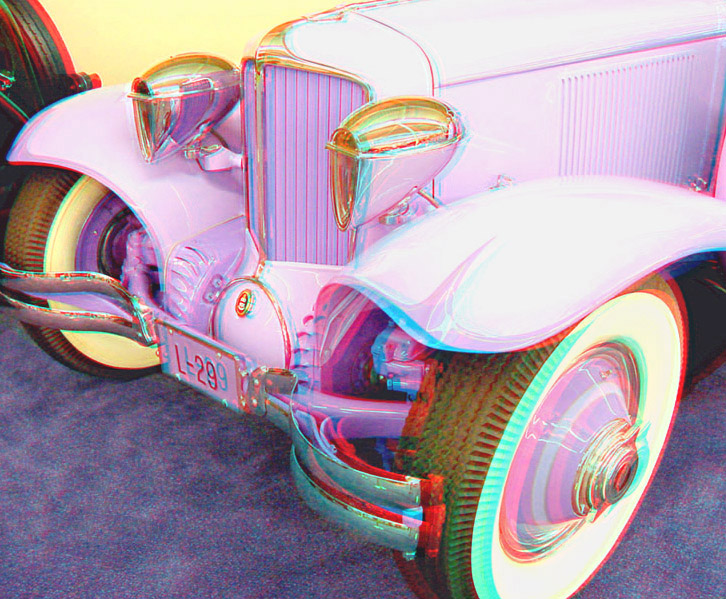
Full color Anachrome red (left eye) and cyan (right eye) filters 3D anachrome glasses are recommended to view this image correctly.

A variation on the anaglyph technique from the early 2000s is called the "Anachrome method". This approach is an attempt to provide images that look nearly normal, without glasses, for small images, either 2D or 3D, with most of the negative qualities being masked innately by the small display. Usually, a larger file can be selected that will fully present the 3D with the dramatic definition. The 3D (Z axis) depth effect is generally more subtle than simple anaglyph images, which are usually made from wider spaced stereoscopic pairs.

Anachrome images are shot with a typically narrower stereoscopic base, (the distance between the camera lenses). Pains are taken to adjust for a better overlay fit of the two images, which are layered one on top of another. Only a few pixels of non-registration give the depth cues. The range of color perceived is noticeably wider in Anachrome image, when viewed with the intended filters. This is due to the deliberate passage of a small (1 to 2%) of the red information through the cyan filter. Warmer tones can be boosted, because each eye sees some color reference to red. The brain responds in the mental blending process and usual perception. It is claimed to provide warmer and more complex perceived skin tones and vividness.

=== Interference filter systems ===
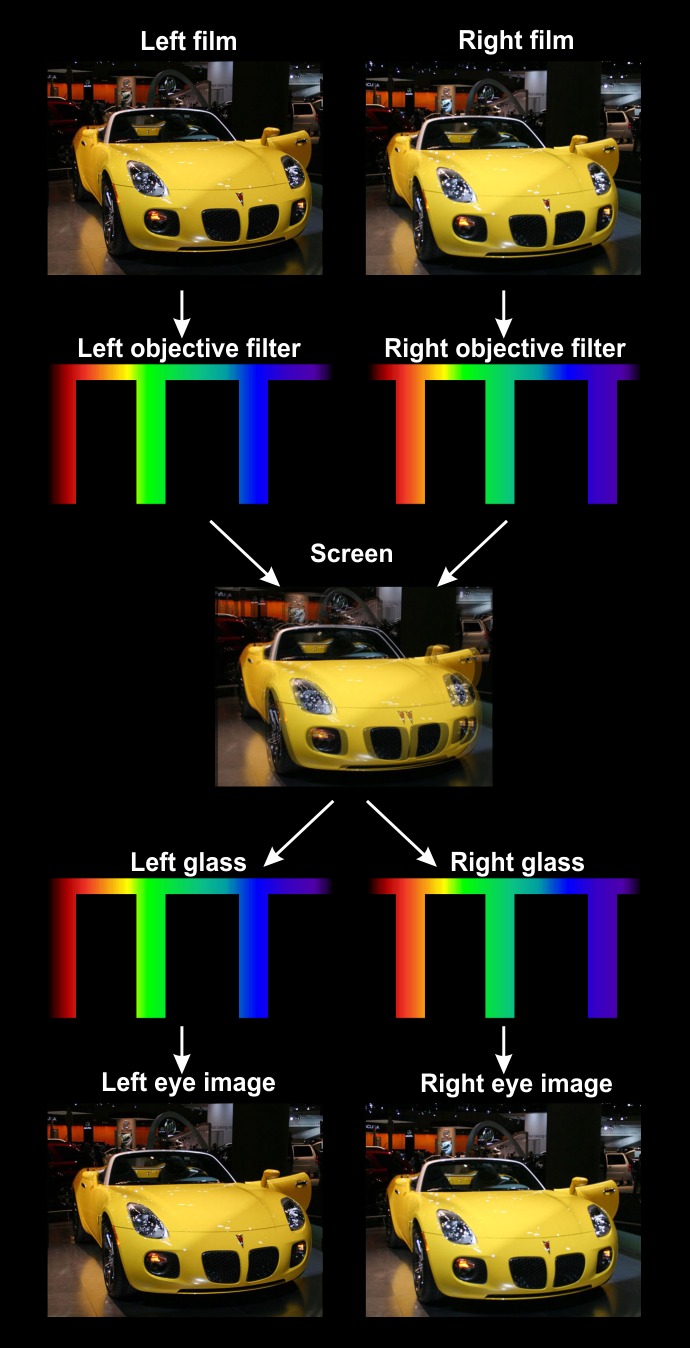
Interference principle

This technique uses specific wavelengths of red, green, and blue for the right eye, and different wavelengths of red, green, and blue for the left eye. Eyeglasses which filter out the very specific wavelengths allow the wearer to see a full color 3D image. Special interference filters (dichromatic filters) in the glasses and in the projector form the main item of technology and have given the system this name. It is also known as spectral comb filtering or wavelength multiplex visualization. Sometimes this technique is described as a "super-anaglyph" because it is an advanced form of spectral-multiplexing which is at the heart of the conventional anaglyph technique. This technology eliminates the expensive silver screens required for polarized systems such as RealD, which is the most common 3D display system in theaters. It does, however, require much more expensive glasses than the polarized systems.

Dolby 3D uses this principle. The filters divide the visible color spectrum into six narrow bands – two in the red region, two in the green region, and two in the blue region (called R1, R2, G1, G2, B1 and B2 for purposes of this description). The R1, G1 and B1 bands are used for one eye image, and R2, G2, B2 for the other eye. The human eye is largely insensitive to such fine spectral differences so this technique can generate full-color 3D images with only slight color differences between the two eyes.

The Omega 3D/Panavision 3D system also used this technology, though with a wider spectrum and more "teeth" to the "comb" (5 for each eye in the Omega/Panavision system). The use of more spectral bands per eye eliminates the need to color process the image, required by the Dolby system. Evenly dividing the visible spectrum between the eyes gives the viewer a more relaxed "feel" as the light energy and color balance is nearly 50-50. Like the Dolby system, the Omega system can be used with white or silver screens. But it can be used with either film or digital projectors, unlike the Dolby filters that are only used on a digital system with a color correcting processor provided by Dolby. The Omega/Panavision system also claims that their glasses are cheaper to manufacture than those used by Dolby.

In June 2012 the Omega 3D/Panavision 3D system was discontinued by DPVO Theatrical, who marketed it on behalf of Panavision, citing "challenging global economic and 3D market conditions". Although DPVO dissolved its business operations, Omega Optical continues promoting and selling 3D systems to non-theatrical markets. Omega Optical's 3D system contains projection filters and 3D glasses. In addition to the passive stereoscopic 3D system, Omega Optical has produced enhanced anaglyph 3D glasses. The Omega's red/cyan anaglyph glasses use complex metal oxide thin film coatings and high quality annealed glass optics.

== Viewing ==
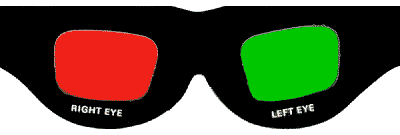
Red-green anaglyph glasses, with red for the right eye (unusual)

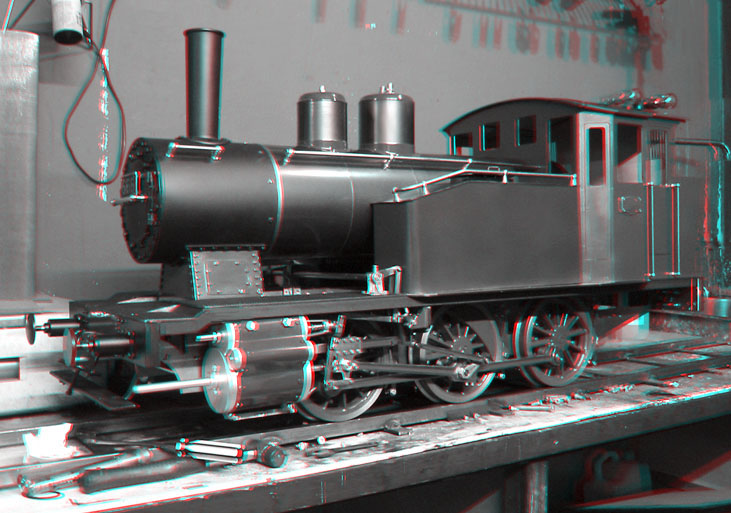
Red-cyan anaglyph of 1:8 scale Live steam locomotive 3D red cyan glasses are recommended to view this image correctly.

A pair of glasses, with filters of opposing colors, is worn to view an anaglyphic photo image. A red filter lens over the left eye allows graduations of red to cyan from within the anaglyph to be perceived as graduations of bright to dark. The cyan (blue/green) filter over the right eye conversely allows graduations of cyan to red from within the anaglyph to be perceived as graduations of bright to dark. Red and cyan color fringes in the anaglyph display represent the red and cyan color channels of the parallax-displaced left and right images. The viewing filters each cancel out opposing colored areas, including graduations of less pure opposing colored areas, to each reveal an image from within its color channel. Thus the filters enable each eye to see only its intended view from color channels within the single anaglyphic image. Red-green glasses are also usable, but may give the viewer a more strongly colored view, since red and green are not complementary colors.

=== Red sharpened anaglyph glasses ===
Simple paper uncorrected gel glasses cannot compensate for the 250 nanometer difference in the wavelengths of the red-cyan filters. With simple glasses, the red filtered image is somewhat blurry when viewing a close computer screen or printed image. The red retinal focus differs from the focus through the cyan filter, which dominates the eyes' focusing. Better-quality molded acrylic glasses frequently employ a compensating differential diopter power (a spherical correction) to balance the red filter focus shift relative to the cyan, which reduces the innate softness and diffraction of red filtered light. Low-power reading glasses worn along with the paper glasses also sharpen the image noticeably.

The correction is only about 1/2 + diopter on the red lens. However, some people with corrective glasses are bothered by difference in lens diopters, as one image is a slightly larger magnification than the other. Though endorsed by many 3D websites, the diopter "fix" is still somewhat controversial. Some, especially the nearsighted, find it uncomfortable. There is about a 400% improvement in acuity with a molded diopter filter, and a noticeable improvement of contrast and blackness. The American Amblyopia Foundation uses this feature in their plastic glasses for school screening of children's vision, judging the greater clarity as a significant plus factor.

=== Anachrome filters ===
Plastic glasses, developed in recent years, provide both the diopter "fix" noted above, and a change in the cyan filter. The formula provides intentional "leakage" of a minimal (2%) percentage of red light with the conventional range of the filter. This assigns two-eyed "redness cues" to objects and details, such as lip color and red clothing, that are fused in the brain. Care must be taken, however, to closely overlay the red areas into near-perfect registration, or "ghosting" can occur. Anachrome formula lenses work well with black and white, but can provide excellent results when the glasses are used with conforming "anachrome friendly" images. The US Geological Survey has thousands of these "conforming" full-color images, which depict the geology and scenic features of the U.S. National Park system. By convention, anachrome images try to avoid excess separation of the cameras and parallax, thereby reducing the ghosting that the extra color bandwidth introduces to the images.

== Traditional anaglyph processing methods ==
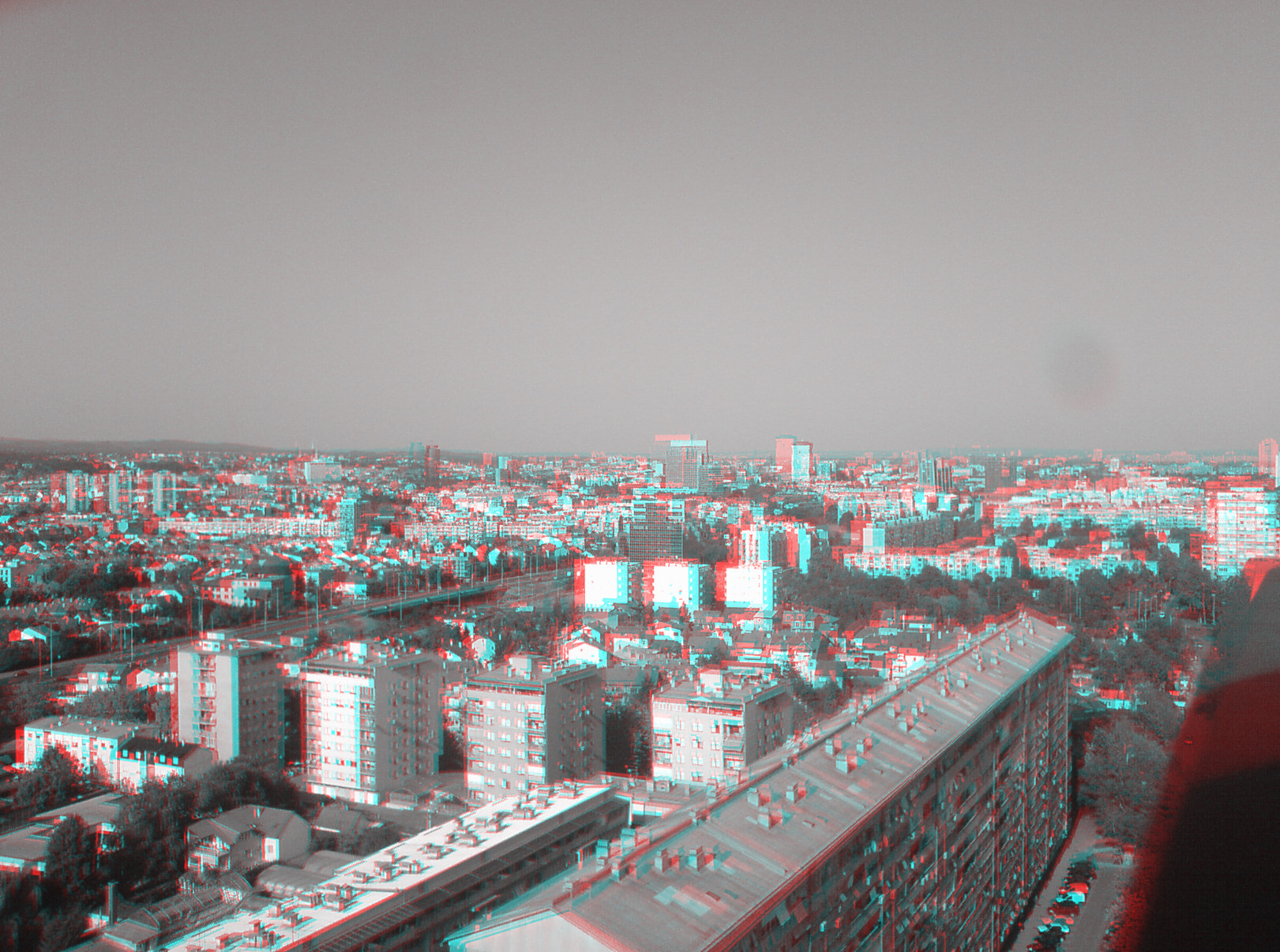
B&W anaglyph of Zagreb taken using one camera. Images were taken about 2 m (6 1/2 ft) apart to get the 3D effect. 3D red cyan glasses are recommended to view this image correctly.

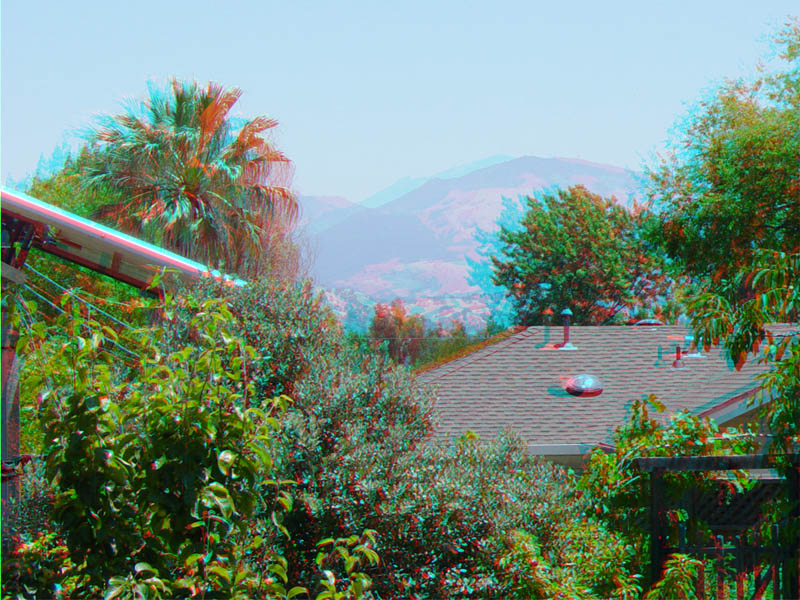
Color anaglyph taken using two cameras about 40 cm (15 in) apart for enhanced depth effect. 3D red cyan glasses are recommended to view this image correctly.

One monochromatic method uses a stereoscopic pair available as a digitized image, along with access to general-purpose image processing software. In this method, the images are run through a series of processes and saved in an appropriate transmission and viewing format such as JPEG.

Several computer programs will create color anaglyphs without Adobe Photoshop, or a traditional, more complex compositing method can be used with Photoshop. Using color information, it is possible to obtain reasonable (but not accurate) blue sky, green vegetation, and appropriate skin tones. Color information appears disruptive when used for brightly colored and/or high-contrast objects such as signs, toys, and patterned clothing when these contain colors that are close to red or cyan.

Only a few color anaglyphic processes, e.g. interference filter systems used for Dolby 3D, can reconstruct full-color 3D images. However, other 3D display methods can easily reproduce full-color photos or movies, e.g. active shutter 3D or polarized 3D systems. Such processes allow better viewing comfort than most limited color anaglyphic methods. According to entertainment trade papers, 3D films had a revival in recent years and 3D is also used in 3D Television.

=== Depth adjustment ===
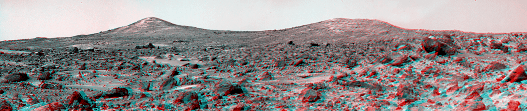
Image as originally presented by NASA with foreground spilling from the frame. This is a two-color (red-cyan) anaglyph from the Mars Pathfinder mission. To view, use a red filter for the left eye and a cyan filter for the right eye. The distant mountain images are aligned, placing them at the screen, and the appearance in the lower right corner is confusing. 3D red cyan glasses are recommended to view this image correctly.

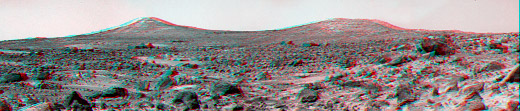
Image adjusted so that most objects appear to be beyond the frame. The mountain images are now separated when viewed without the glasses. This follows the rule for a red left eye filter when distant objects are beyond the image plane: RRR-Red to Right Receding for dark objects on lighter background in the image as it appears without wearing the filters. 3D red cyan glasses are recommended to view this image correctly.

This adjustment is applicable to any type of stereogram but is particularly appropriate when anaglyphed images are to be viewed on a computer screen or on printed matter.

The portions of the left and right images that are coincident will appear to be at the surface of the screen. Depending upon the subject matter and the composition of the image it may be appropriate to make this align to something slightly behind the nearest point of the principal subject (as when imaging a portrait). This will cause the near points of the subject to "pop out" from the screen. For best effect, any portions of a figure to be imaged forward of the screen surface should not intercept the image boundary, as this can lead to a discomforting "amputated" appearance. It is of course possible to create a three-dimensional "pop out" frame surrounding the subject to avoid this condition.

If the subject matter is a landscape, one may consider putting the frontmost object at or slightly behind the surface of the screen. This will cause the subject to be framed by the window boundary and recede into the distance. Once the adjustment is made, trim the picture to contain only the portions containing both left and right images. In the example, the upper image appears (in a visually disruptive manner) to spill out from the screen, with the distant mountains appearing at the surface of the screen. In the lower modification of this image the red channel has been translated horizontally to bring the images of the nearest rocks into coincidence (and thus appearing at the surface of the screen) and the distant mountains now appear to recede into the image. This latter adjusted image appears more natural, appearing as a view through a window onto the landscape.

=== Dual purpose, 2D or 3D "compatible anaglyph" technique ===
Since the advent of the Internet, a variant technique has developed where the images are specially processed to minimize visible mis-registration of the two layers. This technique is known by various names, of which the most common, associated with diopter glasses and warmer skin tones, is anachrome. The technique allows most images to be used as large thumbnails, while the 3D information is encoded into the image with less parallax than conventional anaglyphs.

== Modern anaglyph rendering techniques ==
Anaglyphic images made with cameras used to be constructed by having the lens covered with the appropriate colored filter. Modern video/image rendering programs use a similar technique to achieve the anaglyph effect. Modern anaglyphic rendering programs used to use simulated filters over the virtual cameras, for red/cyan anaglyphs the left camera blocking all but red light being perceived and the right blocking all but the blue and green light being received. This worked okay for creating colorful anaglyph images, but the results were prone to retinal rivalry.

In 2001, Eric Dubois released a paper titled “A projection method to generate anaglyph stereo images”. This paper described a method of filtering for anaglyph images that retained much of the color and reduced ghosting and retinal rivalry. The algorithm used to create this effect is called the least-squares algorithm. The result is a matrix that is applied over each virtual camera and forms a filter. His Matrix has been incorporated into many anaglyph programs such as StereoPhoto Maker and three.js's anaglyph effect.

== Anaglyphic color channels ==
Anaglyph images may use any combination of color channels. However, if a stereoscopic image is to be pursued, the colors should be diametrically opposed. Impurities of color channel display, or of the viewing filters, allow some of the image meant for the other channel to be seen. This results in stereoscopic double imaging, also called ghosting. Color channels may be left-right reversed. Red/cyan is most common. magenta/green and blue/yellow are also popular. Red/green and red/blue enable monochromatic images, especially red/green. Many anaglyph makers purposely integrate impure color channels and viewing filters to enable better color perception, but this results in a corresponding degree of double imaging. Color channel brightness % of white: red-30/cyan-70, magenta-41/green-59 or especially blue-11/yellow-89, the lighter display channel may be darkened or the brighter viewing filter may be darkened to allow both eyes a balanced view. However, the Pulfrich effect can be obtained from a light/dark filter arrangement. The color channels of an anaglyphic image require pure color display fidelity and corresponding viewing filter gels. The choice of ideal viewing filters is dictated by the color channels of the anaglyph to be viewed. Ghosting can be eliminated by ensuring a pure color display and viewing filters that match the display. Retinal rivalry can be eliminated by the (ACB) 3-D Anaglyphic Contrast Balance method patented by that prepares the image pair before color channeling in any color.

Scheme	Left eye	Right eye	Perceived color	Description
red-green	pure red	pure green	monochrome	The predecessor of red-cyan. Used for printed materials, e.g. books and comics.
red-blue	pure red	pure blue	monochrome	Some green-blue color perception. Often used for printed materials. Poor perception of red and inadequate perception of blue when watching LCD, or digital projector due to strong color separation.
red-cyan	pure red	pure cyan; i.e., green + blue	color (poor reds, good greens)	Good color perception of green and blue. No red is visible on digital media due to strong separation of red. This is most commonly used. Regular version (red channel has only the red third of the view) Half version (red channel is a red-tinted grayscale view. Less retinal rivalry).
anachrome	dark red	cyan; i.e., green + blue + some red	color (poor reds)	A variant of red-cyan; left eye has dark red filter, right eye has a cyan filter leaking some red; better color perception, shows red hues with some ghosting.
mirachrome	dark red, and lens	cyan; i.e., green + blue + some red	color (poor reds)	Same as anachrome, with addition of a weak positive correction lens on the red channel to compensate for the chromatic aberration soft focus of red.
Trioscopic	pure green	pure magenta; i.e., red + blue	color (better reds, oranges and wider range of blues than red/cyan)	Same principle as red-cyan, somewhat newer. Less chromatic aberration, as the red and blue in magenta brightness balance well with green. Poor perception of monochrome green on digital media due to strong color separation. Strong ghosting effect on contrast images.
ColorCode 3-D	amber (red + green + neutral grey)	pure dark blue (and optional lens)	color (near full-color perception)	Also named yellow-blue, ochre-blue, or brown-blue. Newer system deployed in 2000s; better color rendering, but dark image, requires dark room or very bright image. Left filter darkened to equalize the brightness received by both eyes as the sensitivity to dark blue is poor. Older people may have problems perceiving the blue. Like in the mirachrome system, the chromatic aberration can be compensated with a weak negative correction lens (−0.7 diopter) over the right eye. Works best in the RG color space. The weak perception of the blue image may allow watching the movie without glasses and not seeing the disturbing double-image.
magenta-cyan	pure magenta; i.e., red + blue	pure cyan; i.e., green + blue	color (better than red-cyan)	Experimental; similar to red-cyan, better brightness balance of the color channels and the same retinal rivalry. Blue channel is blurred horizontally by the amount equal to the average parallax, and visible to both eyes; the blurring prevents eyes from using the blue channel to construct stereoscopic image and therefore prevents ghosting, while supplying both eyes with color information.

In theory, under trichromatic principles, it is possible to introduce a limited amount of multiple-perspective capability (a technology not possible with polarization schemes). This is done by overlapping three images instead of two, in the sequence of green, red, blue. Viewing such an image with red-green glasses would give one perspective, while switching to blue-red would give a slightly different one. In practice, this remains elusive as some blue is perceived through green gel and most green is perceived through blue gel. It is also theoretically possible to incorporate rod cells, which optimally perform at a dark cyan color, in well-optimized mesopic vision, to create a fourth filter color and yet another perspective; however, this has not yet been demonstrated, nor would most televisions be able to process such tetrachromatic filtering.

== Applications ==
=== Home entertainment ===
Disney Studios released Hannah Montana & Miley Cyrus: Best of Both Worlds Concert in August 2008, its first anaglyph 3D Blu-ray. This was shown on the Disney Channel with red-cyan paper glasses in July 2008.

However, on Blu-ray Disc, anaglyph techniques have more recently been supplanted by the Blu-ray 3D format, which uses Multiview Video Coding (MVC) to encode full stereoscopic images. Though Blu-ray 3D does not require a specific display method, and some Blu-ray 3D software players (such as Arcsoft TotalMedia Theatre) are capable of anaglyphic playback, most Blu-ray 3D players are connected via HDMI 1.4 to 3D televisions and other 3D displays using more advanced stereoscopic display methods, such as alternate-frame sequencing (with active shutter glasses) or FPR polarization (with the same passive glasses as RealD theatrical 3D).

=== Comics ===
These techniques have been used to produce 3-dimensional comic books, mostly during the early 1950s, using carefully constructed line drawings printed in colors appropriate to the filter glasses provided. The material presented were from a wide variety of genres, including war, horror, crime, and superhero. Anaglyphed comics were far more difficult to produce than normal comics, requiring each panel to be drawn multiple times on layers of acetate. While the first 3D comic in 1953 sold over two million copies, by the end of the year sales had bottomed out, though 3D comics have continued to be released irregularly up until the present day.

=== Science and mathematics ===
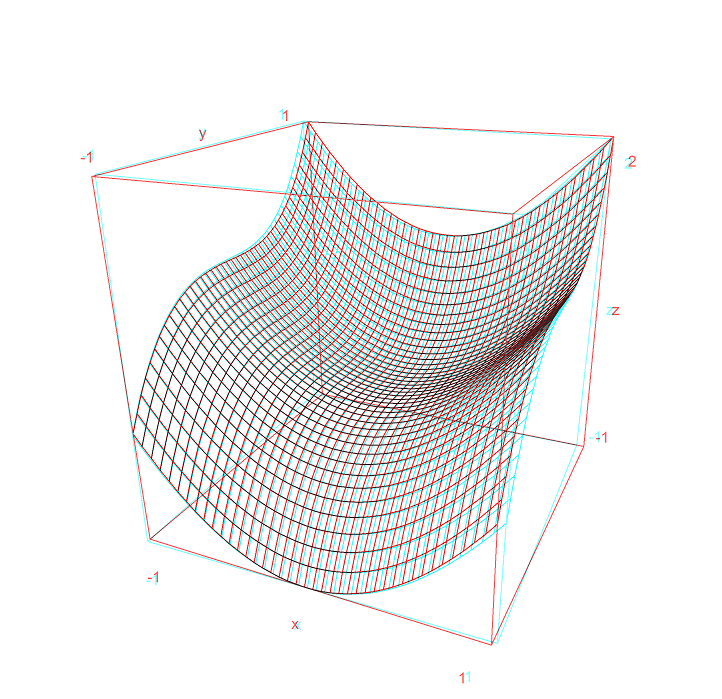
The single valued function of two variables $z(x,y)=x^2+y^3$ with the function value displayed as the height

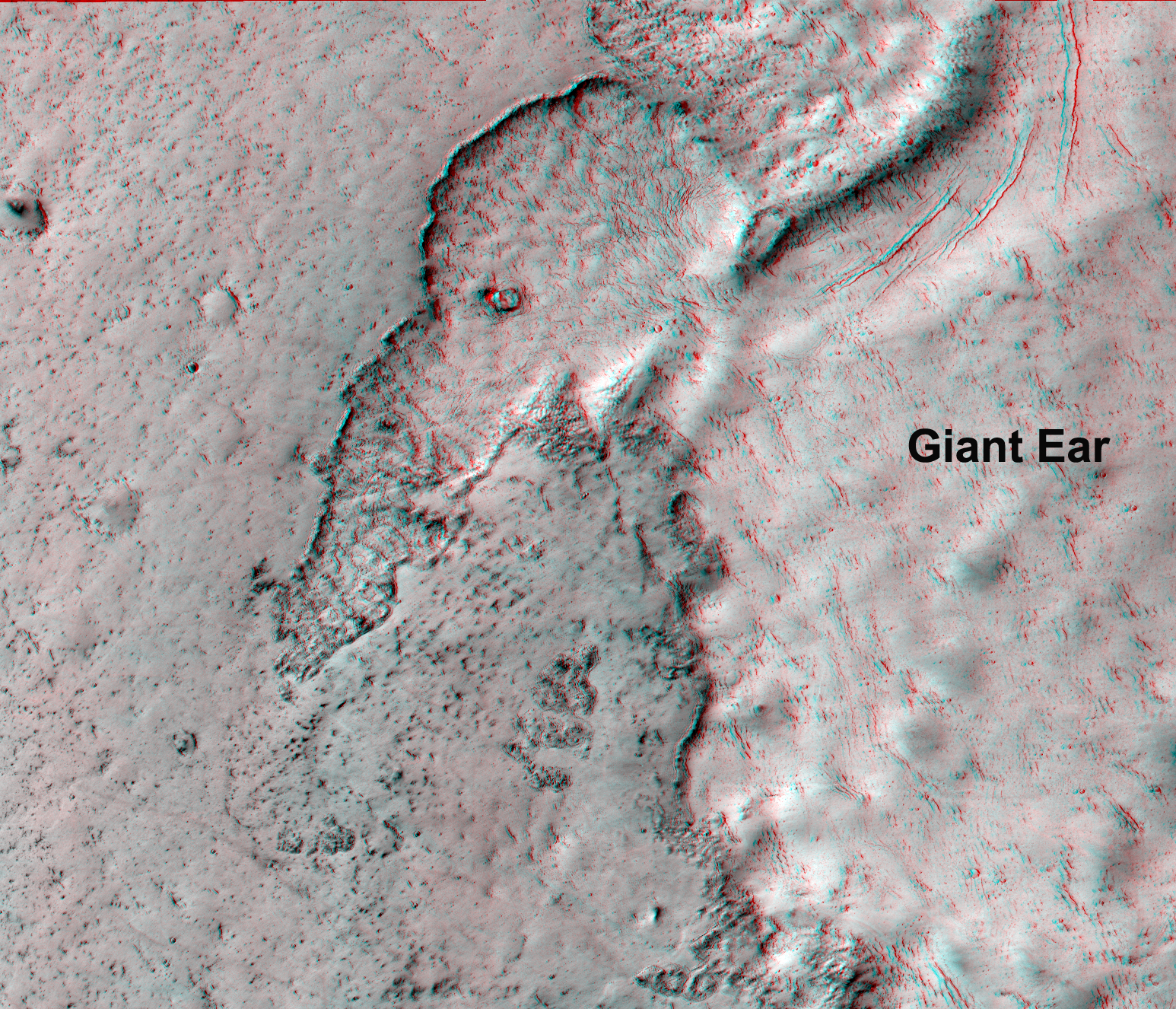
Anaglyph by the Mars Reconnaissance Orbiter's HiRISE camera highlighting Martian lava terrain that looks like an elephant

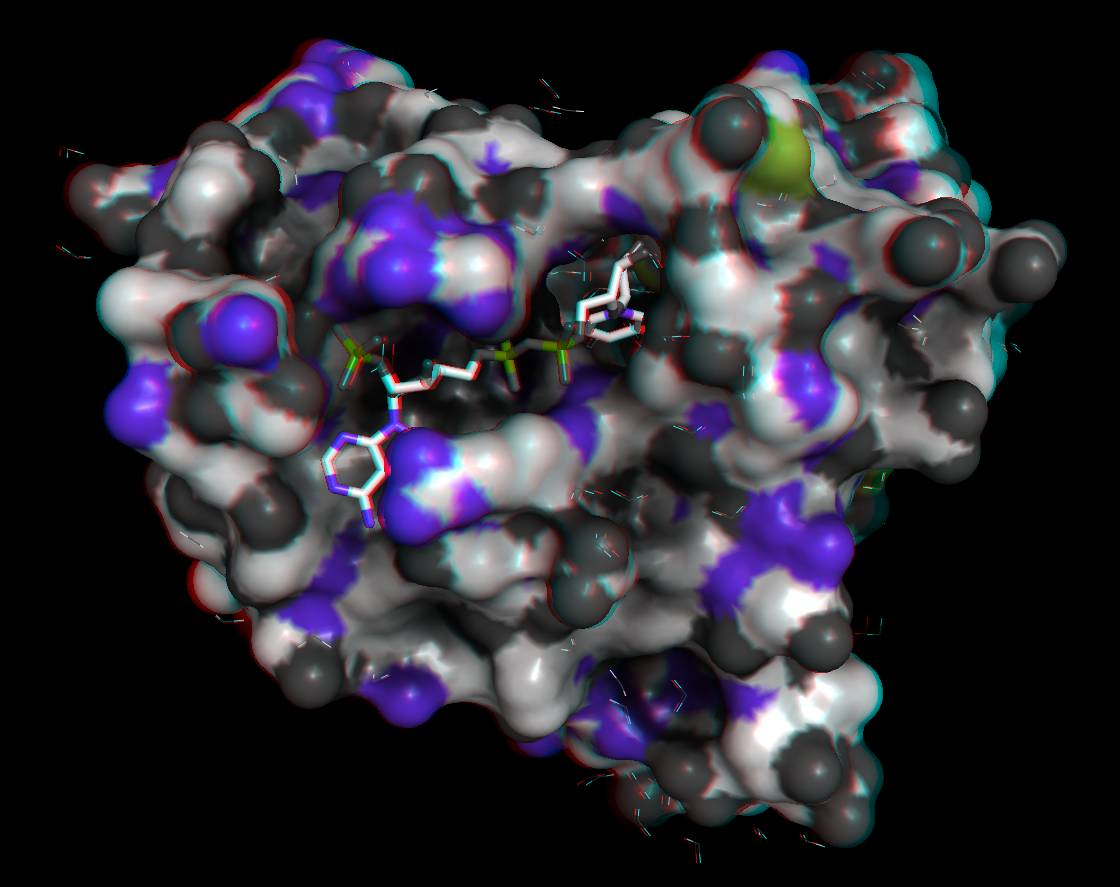
Anaglyph image of the protein DHFR

3D red cyan glasses are recommended to view this image correctly.

Three-dimensional display can also be used to display scientific data sets, or to illustrate mathematical functions. Anaglyph images are suitable both for paper presentation, and moving video display (see neuroimage related paper). They can easily be included in science books, and viewed with cheap anaglyph glasses.

Anaglyphy (including, among others, aerial, telescopic, and microscopic images) is being applied to scientific research, popular science, and higher education.

Also, chemical structures, particularly for large systems, can be difficult to represent in two dimensions without omitting geometric information. Therefore, most chemistry computer software can output anaglyph images, and some chemistry textbooks include them.

Today, there are more advanced solutions for 3D imaging available, like shutter glasses together with fast monitors. These solutions are already extensively used in science, however simpler anaglyph images provide a comfortable way to view scientific visualizations and remain popular.

=== Geography ===
On April 1, 2010, Google launched a feature in Google Street View that shows anaglyphs rather than regular images, allowing users to see the streets in 3D.

== See also ==
- Holography
- Autostereogram
- Phantogram (optical illusion)
- Pulfrich effect
- Vectograph
- Wheatstone viewer
