= Film-type patterned retarder =

FPR (Film-type patterned retarder) is a technology promoted by LG that is employed in its line of 3D televisions based on circular polarization. It shows left and right images through different patterns in a circular polarizer. Left/right polarized glasses allow the left and right images to then be seen by the left and right eyes separately. Both images are combined in the brain and generate the 3D effect. The FPR technology uses the precise film which polarizes different pixels differently (in LG cinema display line of pixels to polarize one way is followed by line to polarize another way) to show a different image for each eye. FPR 3D tech is said to deliver a brighter screen with less cross talk, less ghosting, and no flickering.

== History ==
SG (Shutter Glasses) 3D shows the left and right eye images alternately. When the TV displays the left eye image, the glasses block the signal of right eye image by closing the shutter of right glass lens. By contrast, FPR 3D shows the images of left-eye and right-eye simultaneously, dividing the images into right-eye and left-eye by the correlation between FPR film on panel surface and polarizing glasses.

Shutter glasses mostly eliminate "ghosting" which is a problem with other 3D display technologies such as RealD 3D, or Dual projector setups. Moreover, unlike red/cyan colour filter 3D glasses, LC shutter glasses are colour neutral, enabling 3D viewing in the full colour spectrum, but the technology has problems such as twinkle, vertigo, and uncomfortable glass Liquid crystal shutter glasses.

== Overview ==
FPR (Film-type Patterned Retarder) improves on the cost of Patterned Retarder (PR) technology that needed to add an extra polarizing glasses substrate to the LCD TV panel. FPR has reached the point where it can use film instead of glass, reducing the extra cost to 25% of what it used to be, while the polarized glasses are 80% cheaper than shutter glasses.

== Advantages ==
- Flicker can be easily seen at SG due to the glasses' on/off action & interference with other light sources. FPR does not suffer from increased flickering. Excessive flicker has been the source of complaints over eye fatigue and poor picture quality, as well as serious health concerns like photosensitive epilepsy. The FPR Technology received a "Flicker Free" certification from Intertek and TUV, two of the most respected inspection and certification bodies in the world.
- FPR panels provide brighter 3D images. Nearly two times brighter than conventional 3D TVs, the FPR 3D TV produces brighter and clearer pictures with 3D Light Boost, a thin film covering the screen that enhances brightness in 3D.
- FPR glasses are "passive" and do not use electricity. This means that there is no battery to charge or replace, unlike SG technology. The SG technology can only use glasses which are connected with TV in sync so there are few glasses that viewers can use. In contrast, the FPR technology does not need this process so there is no limit to the number of people who can watch the 3D TV at the same time. In addition, glasses can be shared between different 3D sources, including monitors and laptops.
- FPR replaces glass with film, which costs only 1/4 as much. And the glasses are lighter.
- The glasses used with FPR are much cheaper than the equivalent SG glasses.

== Disadvantages ==
- Because the method relies on polarisation, the angular position of the viewing glasses with respect to the display will affect the crosstalk. It is especially sensitive to the vertical (up/down) angle.

== Effective resolution ==
- Since each eye will only see one of two circularly polarized images and the polarizing filters are static, two unique images must be displayed simultaneously. Intuitively this would require twice the number of pixels (interleaved with the "regular" pixels in rows or columns) to maintain the same effective resolution as a 2D image; without these extra pixels the resolution for each eye is halved. However, due to the way left/right images are combined by the brain to form the final 3D image, the observed resolution corresponds to the full resolution (in terms of for example reading on-screen text)
