= TDVision =

Mexican-American stereoscopic video coding company

TDVision Systems, Inc., was a company that designed products and system architectures for stereoscopic video coding, stereoscopic video games, and head mounted displays. The company was founded by Manuel Gutierrez Novelo and Isidoro Pessah in Mexico in 2001 and moved to the United States in 2004.

The company asserted that there were problems with some 3D deployment technologies, including lack of compatibility with 2D existing pipelines, side effects due to visual artifacts, and detriment on the quality, color, or resolution of the stereoscopic images. The company designed a stereoscopic system that it claimed can reduce some of these side effects by providing full HD left and right images to each eye rather than using interpolation or pixel sub-sampled images. This included a codec called TDVCodec AKA 2D+Delta unveiled in 2007, designed to work with current hardware, such as Blu-ray discs, DVDs, set top boxes, and satellite receivers. The 2D+Delta method is similar to that used in the MPEG-2 Multiview profile and the more recent MVC (Multiview Video Coding) standard. Other TDVision products included the first consumer electronics stereoscopic 3D full HD video camera called TDVCam in 2006 and a head-mounted display for 3D stereoscopic full HD 720p video viewing Head Mounted Display device called TDVisor in 2007.

== Products ==
=== TDVisor ===
TDVisor is a head-mounted display for stereoscopic 3D video viewing. In 2007, it was supported in a Northrop Grumman system called RainStorm., and many other training, remote controlled operations, surveillance, unmanned vehicles, educational and immersive video gaming applications.

=== TDVCodec ===
TDVision developed and patented worldwide the 2D+Delta method of Stereoscopic Video Coding for an encoding and decoding method in 2003, also called the TDVCodec. Key features of the encoding format include up to Full HD (1920x1080) per-eye stereoscopic resolution, and 2D backwards compatibility with existing televisions and Cable television, Satellite Television, Blu-ray, ATSC decoders and PC based systems.

The first demonstration of a full HD 3D Blu-ray Disc running on 2D+Delta and compatible with 2D legacy players in the world was made by TDVision in April 2008 during the National Association of Broadcasters (NAB) Trade Show in Las Vegas, Nevada, as recorded on the press release Stereoscopic 3D Content at Home, Brought to You By TDVision's TDVCodec and then mentioned on the article 3D Blu-ray Closer to Reality in May 2008. The company was then listed as key IP holder on the MVC standard on the ISO JTC Patent Database and the initiative evolved to what is now known as the selected spec of the Blu-ray Disc Association as mentioned in the article Final 3-D Blu-ray Specification Announced where all the characteristics of the 2D+Delta method were confirmed:

"The Blu-ray 3D specification calls for encoding 3-D video using the Multiview Video Coding (MVC) codec, an extension to the ITU-T H.264 Advanced Video Coding (AVC) codec currently supported by all Blu-ray Disc players. MPEG4-MVC compresses both left and right eye views with a typical 50% overhead compared to equivalent 2-D content, and can provide full 1080p resolution backward compatibility with current 2-D Blu-ray Disc players."

== Comparison of the 2D+Delta method to other technologies ==
Some other 3D formats like pixel sub-sampling (side-by-side or over-under or checkerboard, quincunx) require interpolation filters and antialiasing to reconstruct the views. The TDVCodec is said to provide Full HD 3D continuous video streams to the viewer.

Frame Sequential: Frames alternating at 120 Hz effectively displaying full HD per eye sequentially Dual Input: Cinema Projectors and HMDs Horizontal Interleaved: DLP based displays Checkerboard (pixel) interlaced: Micropol Xpol LCD shutter glasses

Other methods include autostereoscopy, holography, and polarization methods using horizontal and vertical or circular polarization.

== Mergers and acquisitions ==
In 2014 the HMD division of TDVision was spun off into a company called ImmersiON. In 2014 ImmersiON acquired the Spanish VR company VRelia and became ImmersiON-VRelia.
