= Stereoscopic video coding =

3D video coding is one of the processing stages required to manifest stereoscopic content into a home. There are three techniques which are used to achieve stereoscopic video:

1. Color shifting (anaglyph)
2. Pixel subsampling (side-by-side, checkerboard, quincunx)
3. Enhanced video stream coding (2D+Delta, 2D+Metadata, 2D plus depth)

== Spatial video encoding ==
- MV-HEVC, extension of HEVC (H.265)
- Multiview Video Coding (MVC 3D)

== See also ==
- 2D plus Delta
- 2D-plus-depth
- Motion compensation
- Multiview Video Coding
