= Phantogram (optical illusion) =

Type of optical illusion

Phantograms, also known as Phantaglyphs, Op-Ups, free-standing anaglyphs, levitated images, and book anaglyphs, are a form of optical illusion. Phantograms use perspectival anamorphosis to produce a 2D image that is distorted in a particular way so as to appear, to a viewer at a particular vantage point, three-dimensional, standing above or recessed into a flat surface. The illusion of depth and perspective is heightened by stereoscopy techniques; a combination of two images, most typically but not necessarily an anaglyph (color filtered stereo image). With common (red–cyan) 3D glasses, the viewer's vision is segregated so that each eye sees a different image.

Phantograms can be created using drawn images, photographs, or computer-generated images. Phantograms are usually placed horizontally and are intended to be viewed standing back from the image, though they can also be placed vertically and viewed at an angle from above or below.

== Principle ==
The pair of images used to create a phantogram are anamorphic projections of a solid object onto a flat surface (using photographs of a real object, or drawings/computer-generated images).

Phantograms work by presenting the viewer with a pair of flat images precisely distorted to mimic the anticipated perspective of a three-dimensional object viewed from the phantogram's intended vantage point. As with other forms of stereoscopy, the illusion reproduces many of the visual cues associated with binocular depth perception, fooling the viewer's vision into perceiving the two-dimensional images as having actual depth. The illusion is limited, however; phantograms lack some cues for depth perception such as convincing parallax, so the viewer must be stationary at the illusion's "sweet spot", a specific point at which the phantogram is designed to be most convincing.

The anamorphic distortion of the source image crucial to the illusion can be understood by likening the images to projections of a 3D object onto a plane (e.g. a sheet of paper) originating from the location of the viewer's eyes. The base of the object meets the plane where the object stands, while the tip of the object is "projected" to a more distant point on the plane. Two projections, one for each eye, are made to produce a pair of images suitable for any dual-image form of stereoscopy (usually anaglyph imaging viewed through colored filter glasses). When the viewer is presented with flat images distorted in this way, the position of points on the image plane matches the points the actual object occupied, producing the illusion.

== History ==
Phantograms are related to anamorphic trompe-l'œil paintings that first appeared during the Renaissance, a famous example of which is Andrea Pozzo's fresco in Sant'Ignazio, featuring a flat area that appears to be a domed ceiling when viewed from the correct vantage point. Contemporary artists such as Kurt Wenner and Julian Beever use similar techniques to create chalk pavement art that appears to be three-dimensional. Similar effects are often seen on televised sporting events, where sponsor logos are painted onto the playing field or track, distorted so as to appear "upright" from the viewpoint of a particular TV camera. However, these examples do not employ any of the stereoscopy techniques that characterize phantograms.

A patent for a technique that uses anaglyph and stereoscopic images was filed in 1926 by inventor Alfred John Macy (U.S. patent 1,592,034). This described rotation of an image with respect to a second, as required to present the illusion of depth from a particular vantage point, and presented different images, but with no anamorphic process to correct proportions, to the viewer's left and right eyes using color filters. Early phantograms were hand-drawn, and examples can be found in mathematical and technical drawing texts from the early 20th century onwards. A book dedicated to the subject of hand-drawn phantograms, Constructing Anaglyph Images on Phantogram Perspective Charts, written by draftsman Raymond Nicyper, was published in 1979. More recently, phantograms created from photographs and computer-generated images have appeared, with photo manipulation computer software making the process of creating them easier and quicker. Numerous patents similar to Macy's 1926 application have been filed, refining the process and detailing different techniques and devices for creating phantograms (Woods, Marjorie (1988); Western, Owen (2002); Aubrey, Steve (2003)). Western and Aubrey registered trademarks for the images resulting from their processes; "Phantaglyph" and "Op-Up" respectively.
