= List of 3D films =

These are lists of 3D films:

- List of 3D films (2005–present)
- List of 3D films (1914–2004)
