= Light field camera =

Type of camera that can also capture the direction of travel of light rays

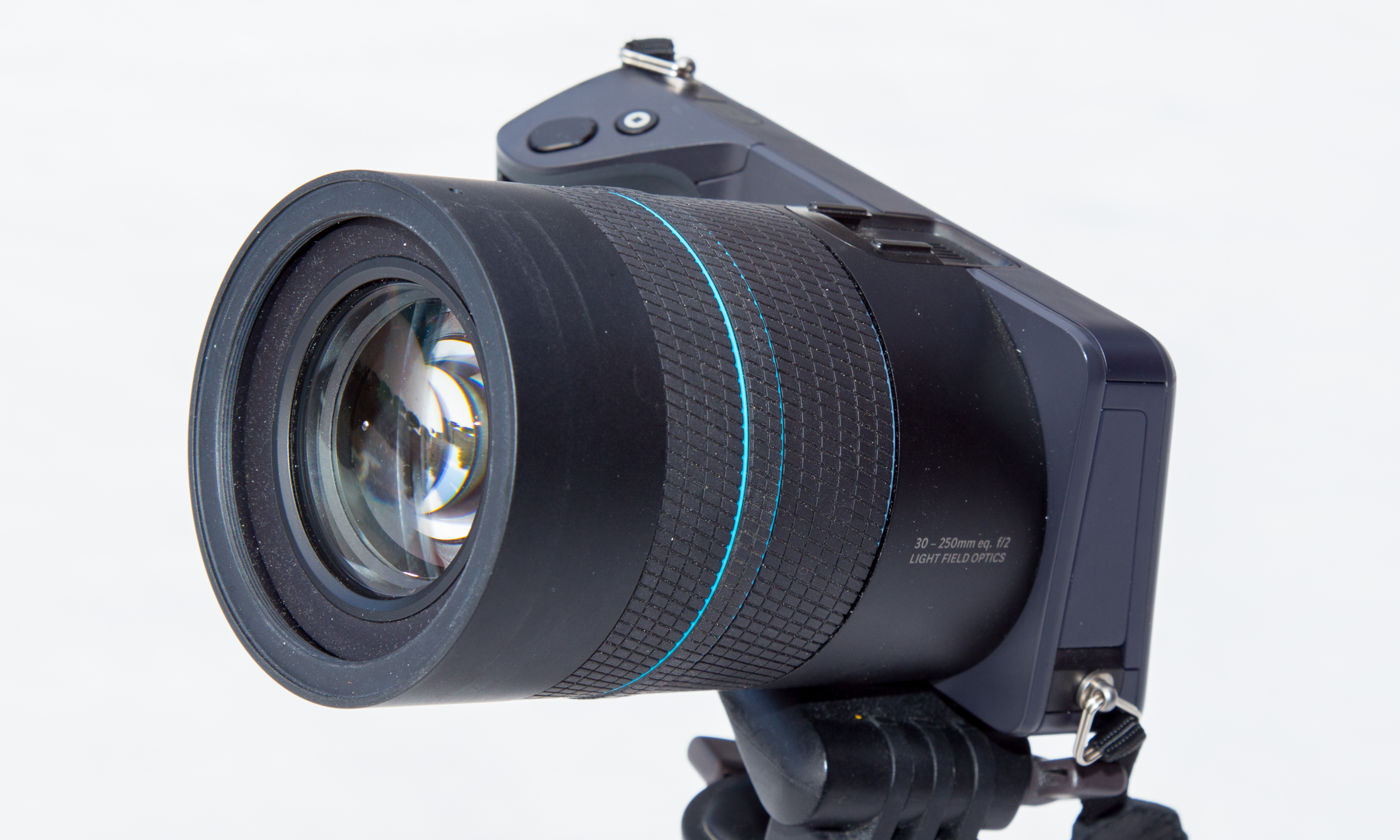
Lytro Illum 2nd generation light field camera

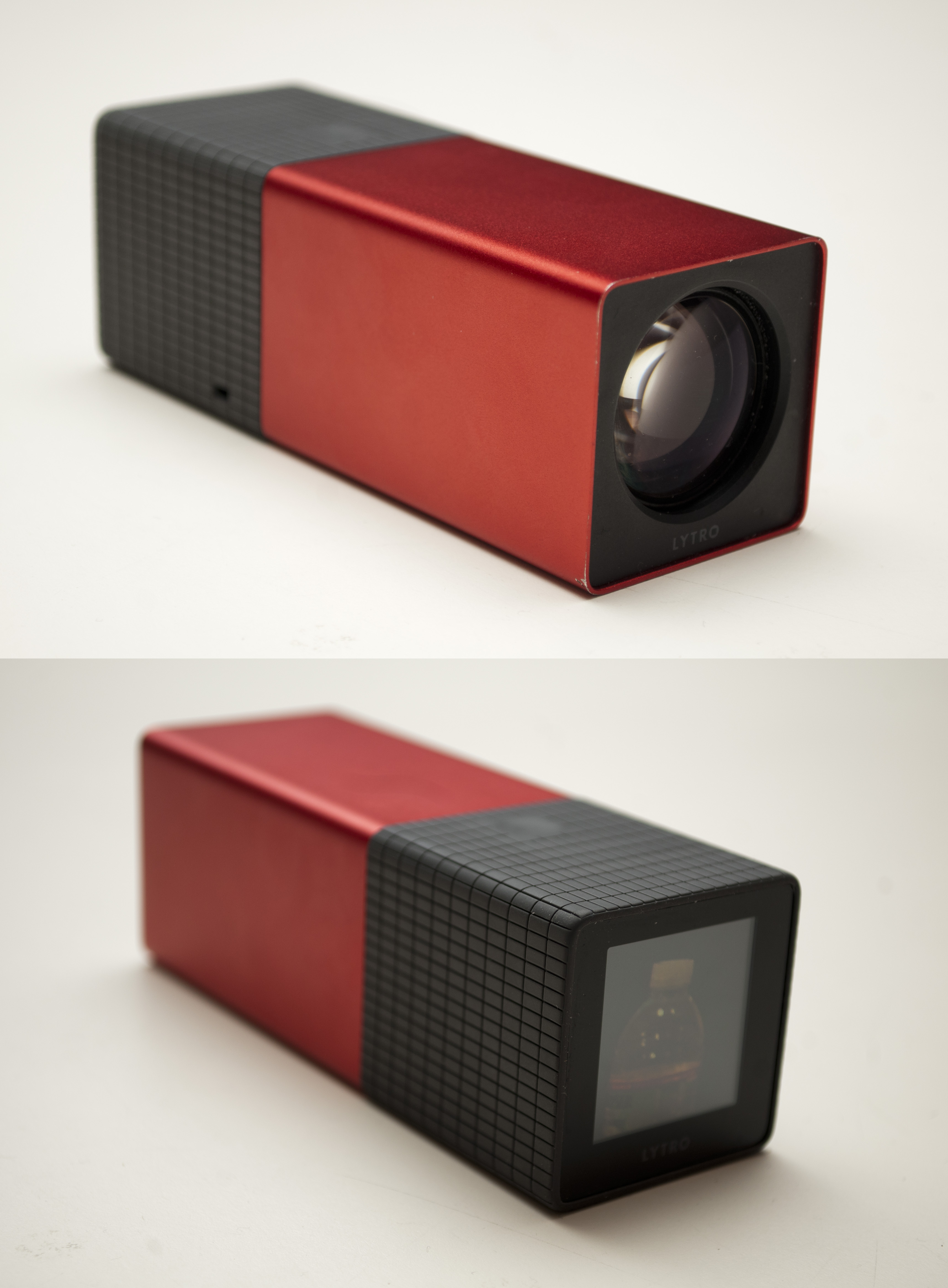
Front and back of a Lytro, the first consumer light field camera, showing the front lens and LCD touchscreen

A light field camera, also known as a plenoptic camera, is a camera that captures information about the light field emanating from a scene; that is, the intensity of light in a scene, and also the precise direction that the light rays are traveling in space. This contrasts with conventional cameras, which record only light intensity at various wavelengths.

One type uses an array of micro-lenses placed in front of an otherwise conventional image sensor to sense intensity, color, and directional information. Multi-camera arrays are another type.

== History ==
=== Early research ===
The first light field camera was proposed by Gabriel Lippmann in 1908. He called his concept "integral photography". Lippmann's experimental results included crude integral photographs made by using a plastic sheet embossed with a regular array of microlenses, or by partially embedding small glass beads, closely packed in a random pattern, into the surface of the photographic emulsion.

In 1992, Adelson and Wang proposed a design that reduced the correspondence problem in stereo matching. To achieve this, an array of microlenses is placed at the focal plane of the camera main lens. The image sensor is positioned slightly behind the microlenses. Using such images, the displacement of image parts that are not in focus can be analyzed and depth information can be extracted.

=== Standard plenoptic camera ===
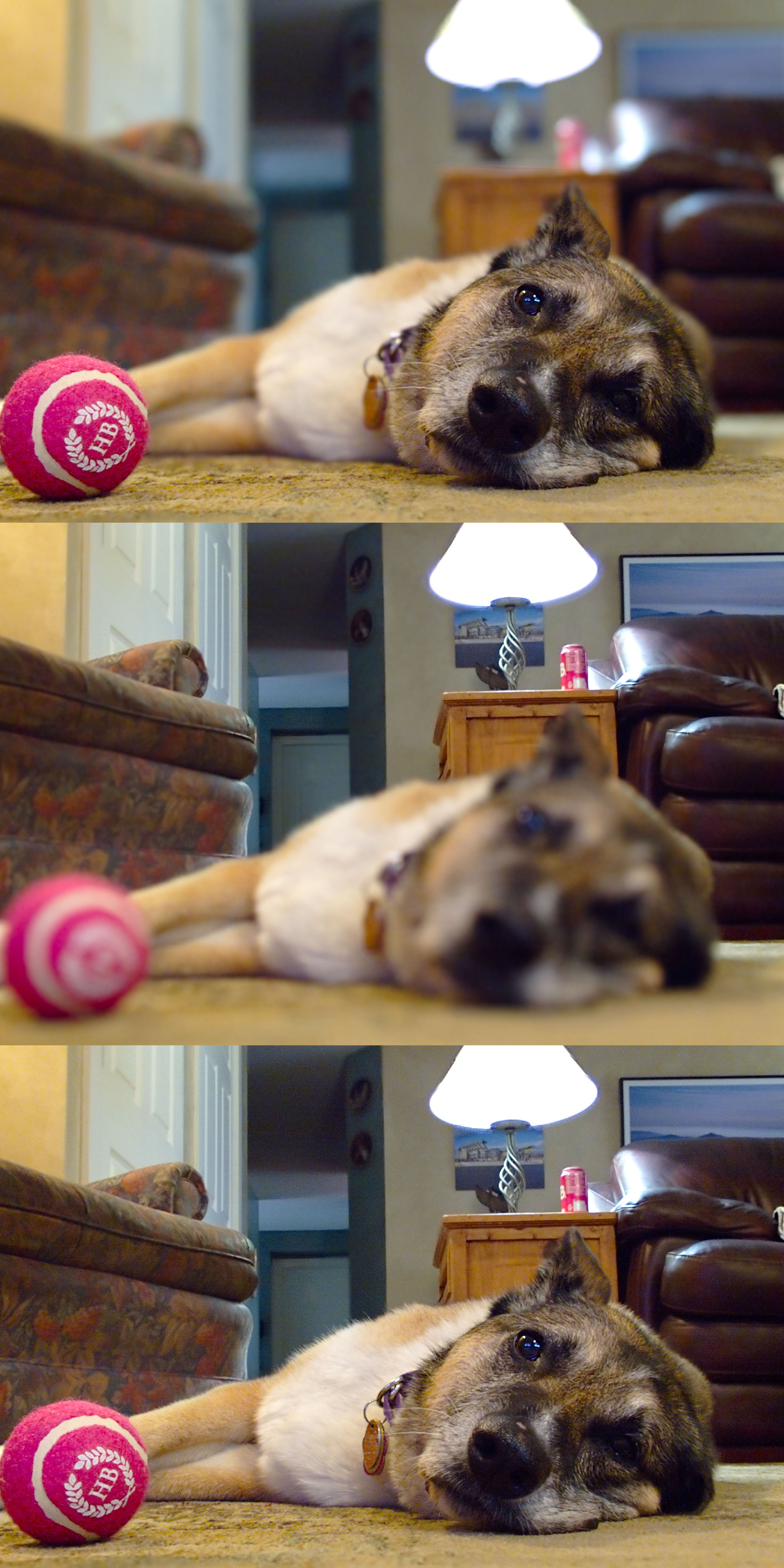
This demonstrates the capability of changing the focal distance and depth of field after a photo is taken - near focus (top), far focus (middle), full depth of field (bottom) - using the Lytro Illum light field camera software

The "standard plenoptic camera" is a mathematical model used by researchers to compare designs. By definition it has microlenses placed one focal length away from the image plane of a sensor. In 2004, a team at Stanford University Computer Graphics Laboratory used a 16-megapixel camera to demonstrate that pictures can be refocused after they are taken. The system used a 90,000-microlens array, yielding a resolution of 90 kilopixels. Research has shown that its maximum baseline is confined to the main lens entrance pupil size which is small relative to stereoscopic setups. This implies that the "standard plenoptic camera" may be intended for close-range applications as it exhibits increased depth resolution at distances that can be metrically predicted based on the camera's parameters.

=== Focused plenoptic camera ===
Lumsdaine and Georgiev described a design in which the microlens array can be positioned before or behind the focal plane of the main lens. This modification samples the light field in a way that trades angular resolution for higher spatial resolution. With this design, images can be refocused with a much higher spatial resolution than images from a standard plenoptic camera. However, the lower angular resolution can introduce aliasing artifacts.

=== Coded aperture camera ===
A design that used a low-cost printed film mask instead of a microlens array was proposed in 2007. This design reduces the chromatic aberrations and loss of boundary pixels seen in microlens arrays, and allows greater spatial resolution. However, the mask-based design reduces the amount of light that reaches the image sensor, reducing brightness.

==== Features ====
Features include:

- Variable depth of field and "refocusing": Lytro's "Focus Spread" feature allows the depth of field (depth of focus) of a 2 dimensional representation of a Lytro image to be adjusted after a picture has been taken. Instead of setting the focus at a particular distance, "Focus Spread" allows more of a 2D image to be in focus. In some cases this may be the entire 2D image field. Users also are able to "refocus" 2D images at particular distances for artistic effects. The Illum allows the "refocus-able" and "Focus Spreadable" range to be selected using the optical focus and zoom rings on the lens. The Illum also features "focus bracketing" to extend the refocusable range by capturing 3 or 5 consecutive images at different depths.
- Speed: Because there is less need to focus the lens before taking a picture, a light field camera can capture images more quickly than conventional point-and-shoot digital cameras. This is an advantage in sports photography, for example, where many pictures are lost because the camera's auto-focus system cannot precisely track a fast moving subject.
- Low-light sensitivity: The ability to adjust focus in post-processing allows the use of larger apertures than are feasible on conventional cameras, thus enabling photography in low-light environments.
- 3D views: Since a plenoptic camera records depth information, 3D views can be constructed in software from a single plenoptic image capture. 3D views are different from solely stereo images in this case. Stereo images may also be constructed.

=== Metalens array ===
In 2022, NJU and NIST announced a device with a focal range of 3 cm (1.2 in) to 1.7 km (1.1 mi). The device employed a 39x39-element titanium dioxide metalens array. Each metalens is either right- or left-circle polarized to create a different focal length. Each metalens was rectangular in shape. The light is routed separately through the shorter and longer sides of the rectangle, producing two focal points in the image. Differences among the metalenses were corrected algorithmically.

== Manufacturers ==
=== Products ===
In November 2021 the German company K|Lens announced the first light field lens available for any standard lens mount on Kickstarter. Although the campaign was cancelled in January 2022, the company has since shifted focus to industrial applications.

Lytro was founded by Stanford University Computer Graphics Laboratory alumnus Ren Ng to commercialize the light field camera he developed as a graduate student. Lytro's light field sensor uses an array of micro-lenses placed in front of an otherwise conventional image sensor; to sense intensity, color, and directional information. Software then uses this data to create displayable 2D or 3D images. Lytro trades maximum 2D resolution, at a given distance, for enhanced resolution at other distances. Users can convert the Lytro camera's proprietary image into a regular 2D image file, at any desired focal distance. The maximum Illum 2D resolution is 2450 × 1634 (4.0 megapixels), The 3D light field resolution is 40 "megarays". It has a maximum 2D resolution of 1080 × 1080 pixels (roughly 1.2 megapixels), Lytro ceased operations in March 2018.

Raytrix has offered several models of plenoptic cameras for industrial and scientific applications since 2010, with field of view starting from 1 megapixel.

d'Optron and Rebellion Photonics offer plenoptic cameras, specializing in microscopy and gas leak detection, respectively.

=== Prototypes ===
Stanford University Computer Graphics Laboratory developed a prototype light field microscope using a microlens array similar to the one used in their light field camera. The prototype is built around a Nikon Eclipse transmitted light microscope/wide-field fluorescence microscope and standard CCD cameras. Light field capture is obtained by a module containing a microlens array and other optical components placed in the light path between the objective lens and camera, with the final multifocused image rendered using deconvolution.

A later prototype added a light field illumination system consisting of a video projector (allowing computational control of illumination) and a second microlens array in the illumination light path of the microscope. The addition of a light field illumination system both allowed for additional types of illumination (such as oblique illumination and quasi-dark-field) and correction for optical aberrations.

The Adobe light field camera is a prototype 100-megapixel camera that takes a three-dimensional photo of the scene in focus using 19 uniquely configured lenses. Each lens takes a 5.2-megapixel photo of the scene. Each image can be focused later in any way.

CAFADIS is a plenoptic camera developed by University of La Laguna (Spain). CAFADIS stands (in Spanish) for phase-distance camera, since it can be used for distance and optical wavefront estimation. From a single shot it can produce images focused at different distances, depth maps, all-in-focus images and stereo pairs. A similar optical design can be used in adaptive optics in astrophysics.

Mitsubishi Electric Research Laboratories's (MERL) light field camera is based on the principle of optical heterodyning and uses a printed film (mask) placed close to the sensor. Any hand-held camera can be converted into a light field camera using this technology by simply inserting a low-cost film on top of the sensor. A mask-based design avoids the problem of loss of resolution, since a high-resolution photo can be generated for the focused parts of the scene.

Pelican Imaging has thin multi-camera array systems intended for consumer electronics. Pelican's systems use from 4 to 16 closely spaced micro-cameras instead of a micro-lens array image sensor. Nokia invested in Pelican Imaging to produce a plenoptic camera system with 16-lens array that was expected to be implemented in Nokia smartphones in 2014. Pelican moved to designing supplementary cameras that add depth-sensing capabilities to a device's main camera, rather than stand-alone array cameras.

A collaboration between University of Bedfordshire and ARRI resulted in a custom-made plenoptic camera with a ray model for the validation of light-field geometries and real object distances.

The modification of standard digital cameras requires little more than suitable sheets of micro-lens material, hence a number of hobbyists have produced cameras whose images can be processed to give either selective depth of field or direction information.

== Applications ==
In a 2017 study, researchers observed that incorporation of light field photographed images into an online anatomy module did not result in better learning outcomes compared to an identical module with traditional photographs of dissected cadavers.

Plenoptic cameras are good for imaging fast-moving objects that outstrip autofocus capabilities, and for imaging objects where autofocus is not practical such as with security cameras. A recording from a security camera based upon plenoptic technology could be used to produce an accurate 3D model of a subject.

== Software ==
Lytro Desktop is a cross-platform application to render light field photographs taken by Lytro cameras. It remains closed source and is not maintained since Google's acquisition of Lytro. Several open-source tools have been released meanwhile. A Matlab tool for Lytro-type camera processing can be found. PlenoptiCam is a GUI-based application considering Lytro's and custom-built plenoptic cameras with cross-platform compatibility and the source code being made available online.

== See also ==
- Angle-sensitive pixel
- Bokeh
- Compound eye
- Femto-photography
- Integral imaging
- Light-in-flight imaging
- Photo finish
- Streak camera
- Strip photography
