= Gabriel Lippmann =

French physicist (1845–1921)

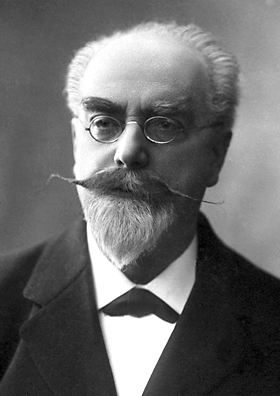
- Lippmann in 1908
- Born: 16 August 1845; Hollerich, Luxembourg
- Died: 12 July 1921 (aged 75); Atlantic Ocean
- Education: ENS Paris Heidelberg University: Dr. phil., Physics; University of Paris: Dr ès sc., Physics
- Known for: Lippmann plate; Lippmann electrometer; Integral photography; Piezoelectricity
- Awards: Progress Medal (1897); Nobel Prize in Physics (1908)
- Scientific career
- Fields: Physics
- Workplaces: University of Paris
- Thesis: Relations entre les phénomènes électriques et capillaires (1875)
- Doctoral advisors: Jules Jamin; Gustav Kirchhoff
- Doctoral students: Pierre Curie; Marie Curie; Jean Lecomte; Constantin Miculescu

Jonas Ferdinand Gabriel Lippmann (/ˈlɪpmən/ LIP-muhn; French: [ɡabʁijɛl lipman]; 16 August 1845 – 12 July 1921) was a French physicist who received the Nobel Prize in Physics in 1908 for his invention of the Lippmann plate, a method of photographically reproducing colours based on the interference phenomenon.

== Biography ==
Jonas Ferdinand Gabriel Lippmann was born on 16 August 1845 to French parents in Bonnevoie, Hollerich, Luxembourg, where his father ran a tannery and a glove factory. In 1848, the family moved to Paris, where Lippmann was initially homeschooled by his mother, before entering the Lycée Napoléon (now the Lycée Henri-IV) in 1858. Throughout his formal education, he was said to have been a rather inattentive but independent pupil with an interest in only certain subjects. In 1868, he was admitted to École normale supérieure de Paris, where he failed the agrégation, which would have enabled him to enter the teaching profession.

In 1873, the French government sent Lippmann on a scientific mission to Germany to study methods of teaching science. He worked with Wilhelm Kühne and Gustav Kirchhoff at Heidelberg University, where he graduated summa cum laude with a Doctor of Philosophy in 1874. He then made a brief visit to Hermann von Helmholtz in Berlin, before returning to Paris. On 24 July 1875, he submitted his Doctor of Science thesis on electrocapillarity to the University of Paris.

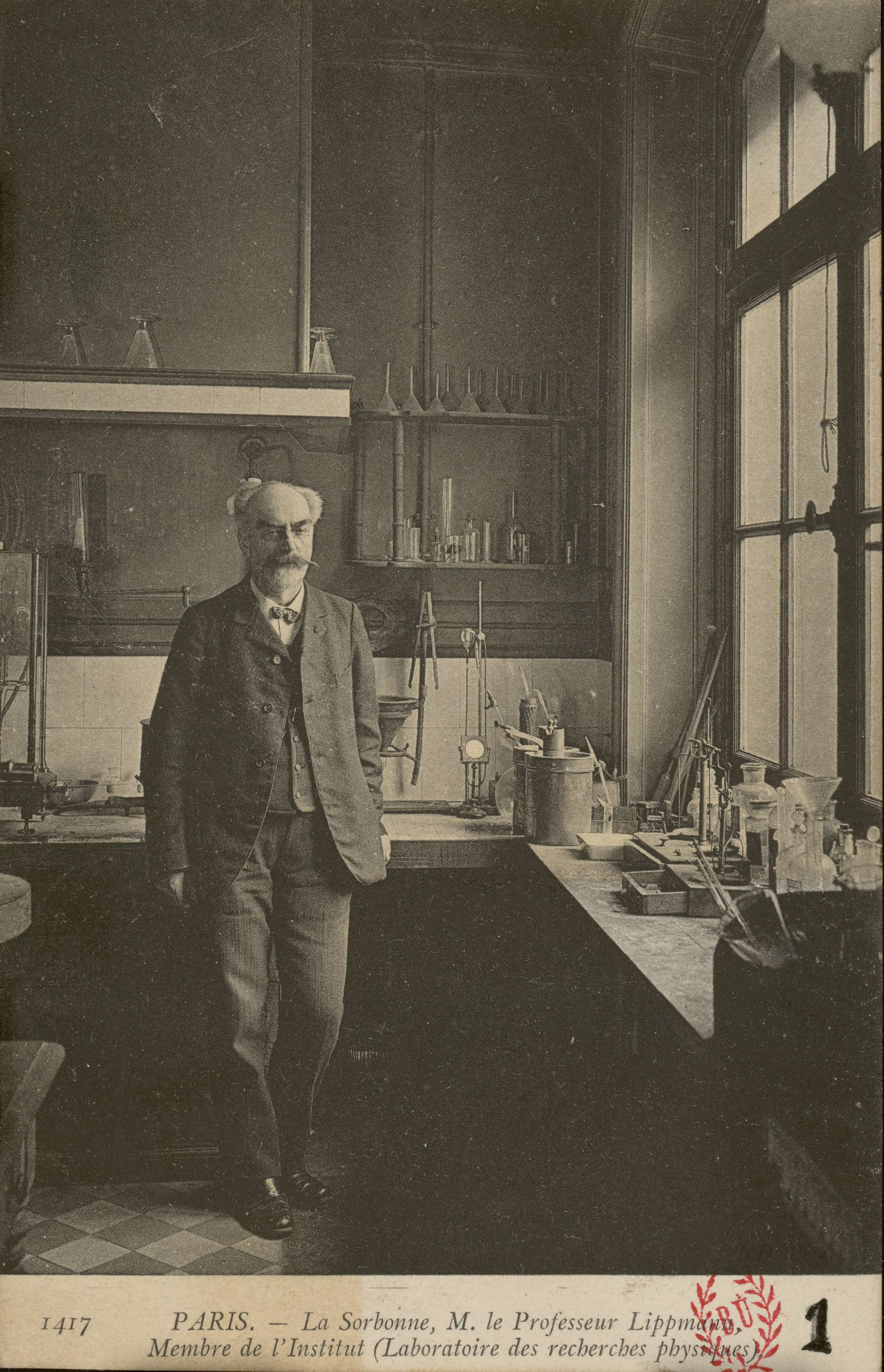
Professor Lippmann in the Sorbonne laboratory for research in physics (Bibliothèque de la Sorbonne, NuBIS)

In 1878, Lippmann joined the Faculty of Sciences at the University of Paris. In 1883, he became Professor of Mathematical Physics, and in 1886 was appointed Professor of Experimental Physics. In 1886, he succeeded Jules Jamin as Director of the Research Laboratory, which was subsequently transferred to the University.

In 1888, Lippmann married the daughter of the novelist Victor Cherbuliez.

Lippmann died at sea, when he was on the return voyage from Canada to France, on 12 July 1921 at the age of 75.

== Inventions and theories ==
=== Capillary electrometer ===
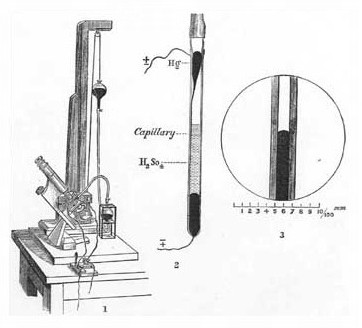
Lippmann electrometer

One of Lippmann's early discoveries was the relationship between electrical and capillary phenomena, which allowed him to develop a sensitive capillary electrometer—subsequently known as the Lippmann electrometer—which was used in the first ECG machine. In a paper delivered to the Philosophical Society of Glasgow on 17 January 1883, John Gray McKendrick described the apparatus as follows:

Lippmann's electrometer consists of a tube of ordinary glass, 1 metre long and 7 millimetres in diameter, open at both ends, and kept in the vertical position by a stout support. The lower end is drawn into a capillary point, until the diameter of the capillary is 0.005 of a millimetre. The tube is filled with mercury, and the capillary point is immersed in dilute sulfuric acid (1 to 6 of water in volume), and in the bottom of the vessel containing the acid there is a little more mercury. A platinum wire is put into connection with the mercury in each tube, and, finally, arrangements are made by which the capillary point can be seen with a microscope magnifying 250 diameters. Such an instrument is very sensitive; and Lippmann states that it is possible to determine a difference of potential so small as that of one 10,080th of a Daniell. It is thus a very delicate means of observing and (as it can be graduated by a compensation-method) of measuring minute electromotive forces.

=== Piezoelectricity ===
In 1881, Lippmann predicted the converse piezoelectric effect.

=== Colour photography ===
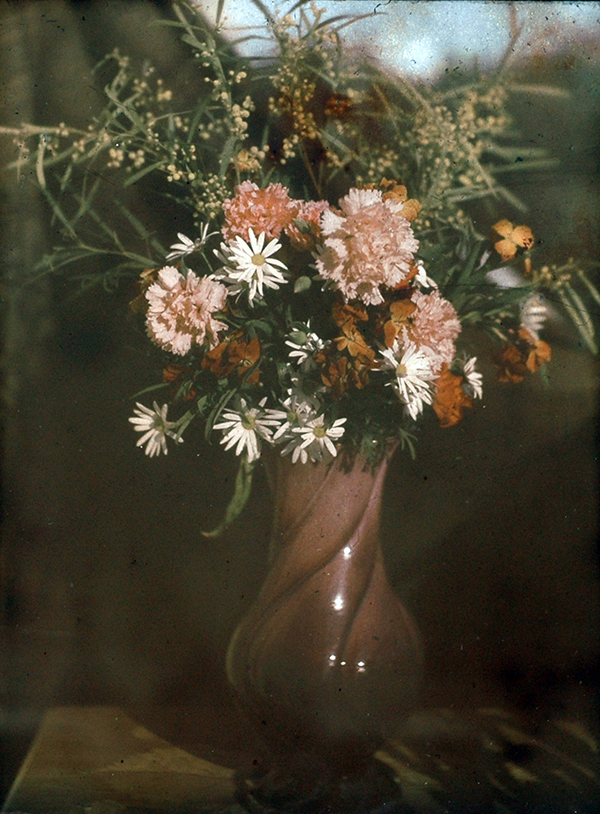
A colour photograph made by Lippmann in the 1890s. It contains no pigments or dyes of any kind.

Above all, Lippmann is best remembered as the inventor of a method for reproducing colours by photography, based on the interference phenomenon, which earned him the Nobel Prize in Physics in 1908.

In 1886, Lippmann's interest turned to a method of fixing the colours of the solar spectrum on a photographic plate. On 2 February 1891, he announced to the French Academy of Sciences: "I have succeeded in obtaining the image of the spectrum with its colours on a photographic plate whereby the image remains fixed and can remain in daylight without deterioration." By April 1892, he reported that he had succeeded in producing colour images of a stained glass window, a group of flags, a bowl of oranges topped by a red poppy and a multicoloured parrot. He presented his theory of colour photography using the interference method in two papers to the Academy, one in 1894, the other in 1906.

A standing wave. The red dots are the wave nodes.

The interference phenomenon in optics occurs as a result of the wave propagation of light. When light of a given wavelength is reflected back upon itself by a mirror, standing waves are generated, much as the ripples resulting from a stone dropped into still water create standing waves when reflected back by a surface such as the wall of a pool. In the case of ordinary incoherent light, the standing waves are distinct only within a microscopically thin volume of space next to the reflecting surface.

Lippmann made use of this phenomenon by projecting an image onto a special photographic plate capable of recording detail smaller than the wavelengths of visible light. The light passes through the supporting glass sheet into a very thin and nearly transparent photographic emulsion containing sub microscopically small silver halide grains. A temporary mirror of liquid mercury in intimate contact with the emulsion reflects the light back through it, creating standing waves whose nodes has little effect while their antinodes create a latent image. After development, the result is a structure of lamellae, a very fine fringe pattern in distinct parallel layers composed of submicroscopic metallic silver grains, which is a permanent record of the standing waves. Throughout the emulsion, the spacing of the lamellae corresponds to the half-wavelengths of the light photographed; λ/(2n), λ being the wavelength of light in air and n is the refractive index of the emulsion. Thus colour information is stored locally. The larger the separation between the fringes, the longer was the wavelength recorded from the image colour, red being the longest.

The finished plate is illuminated from the front at a nearly perpendicular angle, using daylight or another source of white light containing the full range of wavelengths in the visible spectrum. At each point on the plate, light of approximately the same wavelength as the light which has generated the lamellae is strongly reflected back toward the viewer. Light of other wavelengths which was not absorbed or scattered by the silver grains is simply passed through the emulsion, usually to be absorbed by a black anti-reflection coating applied to the back of the plate after it had been developed. The wavelengths, and therefore the colours, of the light which had formed the original image are thus reconstituted and a full-colour image is seen.

In practice, the Lippmann process is not easy to use. Extremely fine-grained high-resolution photographic emulsions are inherently much less light-sensitive than ordinary emulsions, so long exposure times are required. With a lens of large aperture and a very brightly sunlit subject, a camera exposure of less than one minute is sometimes possible, but exposures measured in minutes are typical. Pure spectral colours reproduced brilliantly, but the ill-defined broad bands of wavelengths reflected by real-world objects can be a problem. The process does not produce colour prints on paper and it proved impossible to make a good duplicate of a Lippmann colour photograph by rephotographing it, so each image is unique. A very shallow-angled prism was usually cemented to the front of the finished plate to deflect unwanted surface reflections, and this made plates of any substantial size impractical. The size of his early photographs are 4 cm by 4 cm, increased later to 6.5 cm by 9 cm. The lighting and viewing arrangement required to see the colours to best effect preclude casual use. Although the special plates and a plate holder with a built-in mercury reservoir were commercially available for a few years c. 1900, even expert users found consistent good results elusive and the process never graduated from being a scientifically elegant laboratory curiosity. It did, however, stimulate interest in the further development of colour photography.

Lippmann's process foreshadowed laser holography, which is also based on recording standing waves in a photographic medium. Denisyuk reflection holograms, often referred to as Lippmann–Bragg holograms, have similar lamellar structures that preferentially reflect certain wavelengths. In the case of actual multiple-wavelength colour holograms of this type, the colour information is recorded and reproduced just as in the Lippmann process, except that the highly coherent laser light passing through the recording medium and reflected back from the subject generates the required distinct standing waves throughout a relatively large volume of space, eliminating the need for reflection to occur immediately adjacent to the recording medium. Unlike Lippmann colour photography, however, the lasers, the subject, and the recording medium must all be kept stable to within one quarter of a wavelength during the exposure in order for the standing waves to be recorded adequately or at all.

=== Integral photography ===
In 1908, Lippmann introduced what he called "integral photography", in which a plane array of closely spaced, small, spherical lenses is used to photograph a scene, recording images of the scene as it appears from many slightly different horizontal and vertical locations. When the resulting images are rectified and viewed through a similar array of lenses, a single integrated image, composed of small portions of all the images, is seen by each eye. The position of the eye determines which parts of the small images it sees. The effect is that the visual geometry of the original scene is reconstructed, so that the limits of the array seem to be the edges of a window through which the scene appears life-size and in three dimensions, realistically exhibiting parallax and perspective shift with any change in the position of the observer. This principle of using numerous lenses or imaging apertures to record what was later termed a light field underlies the evolving technology of light field cameras and microscopes.

When Lippmann presented the theoretical foundations of his "integral photography" in March 1908, it was impossible to accompany them with concrete results. At the time, the materials necessary for producing a lenticular screen with the proper optical qualities were lacking. In the 1920s, promising trials were made by Eugène Estanave, using glass Stanhope lenses, and by Louis Lumière, using celluloid. Lippmann's integral photography was the foundation of research on 3D and animated lenticular imagery and also on color lenticular processes.

=== Measurement of time ===
In 1895, Lippmann evolved a method of eliminating the personal equation in measurements of time, using photographic registration, and he studied the eradication of irregularities of pendulum clocks, devising a method of comparing the times of oscillation of two pendulums of nearly equal period.

=== The coelostat ===
Lippmann also invented the coelostat, an astronomical tool that compensated for the Earth's rotation and allowed a region of the sky to be photographed without apparent movement.

=== Brownian ratchet ===
In 1900, Lippmann proposed what is later called the Brownian ratchet, as a purely mechanical version of Maxwell's demon, purportedly showing that the kinetic theory of gases is incompatible with the second law of thermodynamics.

== Recognition ==
=== Honours ===
Year	Country	Honour	Ref.
1881	France	Knight of the Legion of Honour	
1894	France	Officer of the Legion of Honour	
1900	France	Commander of the Legion of Honour	
1919	France	Grand Officer of the Legion of Honour	

=== Memberships ===
Year	Organisation	Type	Ref.
1886	French Academy of Sciences	Member	
1892	Accademia delle Scienze di Torino	Corresponding Member	
1896	Royal Society	Foreign Member	

=== Awards ===
Year	Organisation	Award	Citation	Ref.
1897	Royal Photographic Society	Progress Medal	—	
1908	Royal Swedish Academy of Sciences	Nobel Prize in Physics	"For his method of reproducing colours photographically based on the phenomenon of interference."	

== See also ==
- Autostereoscopy
- Brownian ratchet
- Light field camera
- List of Jewish Nobel laureates
