= Ren Ng =

Malaysian-American scientist (born 1979)

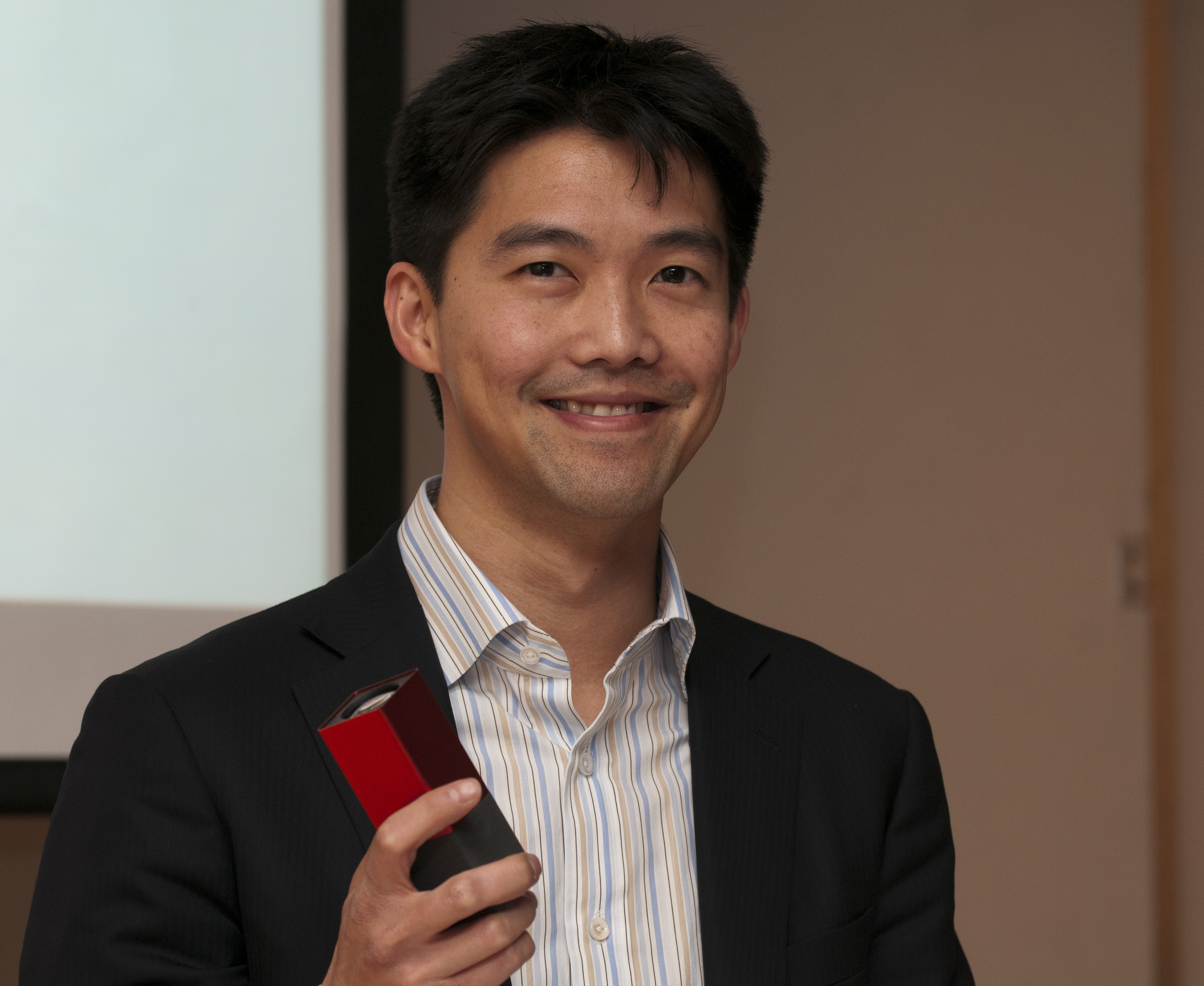
- Ng with a Lytro light field camera in 2012
- Born: Yi-Ren Ng; September 21, 1979 (age 47); Malaysia
- Occupations: Associate Professor, University of California, Berkeley; Founder, Executive Chairman and Former CEO, Lytro

Yi-Ren Ng (born September 21, 1979) is a Malaysian-American scientist who is an associate professor in the Department of Electrical Engineering & Computer Sciences at the University of California, Berkeley. He was the founder, executive chairman and CEO of Lytro, a Mountain View, California-based startup company. Lytro was developing consumer light-field cameras based on Ng's graduate research at Stanford University. Lytro ceased operations in late March 2018.

== Early life and education ==
Ng was born in Malaysia, and immigrated to Australia at the age of 9. He earned a B.S. degree in mathematical and computational science in 2001, an M.S. in computer science in 2002, and a Ph.D. in computer science in 2006, all from Stanford University. His doctoral dissertation, titled Digital Light Field Photography, received the 2006 ACM Doctoral Dissertation Award.

== Business career ==
Ng interned at Microsoft from June 2000 to September 2000 and June 2003 to September 2003 while studying at Stanford. After graduation in 2006, Ng founded Lytro and was CEO for more than six years. On June 29, 2012, Ng announced that he would step aside as CEO in order to spend more time on the vision for the company and less on its day-to-day operations. Ng also would become executive chairman and remain at Lytro full-time. Charles Chi, then executive chairman, served as interim CEO until Ng chose former Ning chief Jason Rosenthal as Lytro's new CEO in March 2013 after a lengthy external search.

== Academic ==
In 2013, Ng was awarded the Royal Photographic Society's Selwyn Award given to those under the age of 35 years who have conducted successful science-based research connected with imaging.

In July 2015, Ng became an assistant professor in the Department of Electrical Engineering & Computer Sciences at College of Engineering of University of California, Berkeley.
