= Microlens =

Small lens, generally with a diameter less than a millimetre

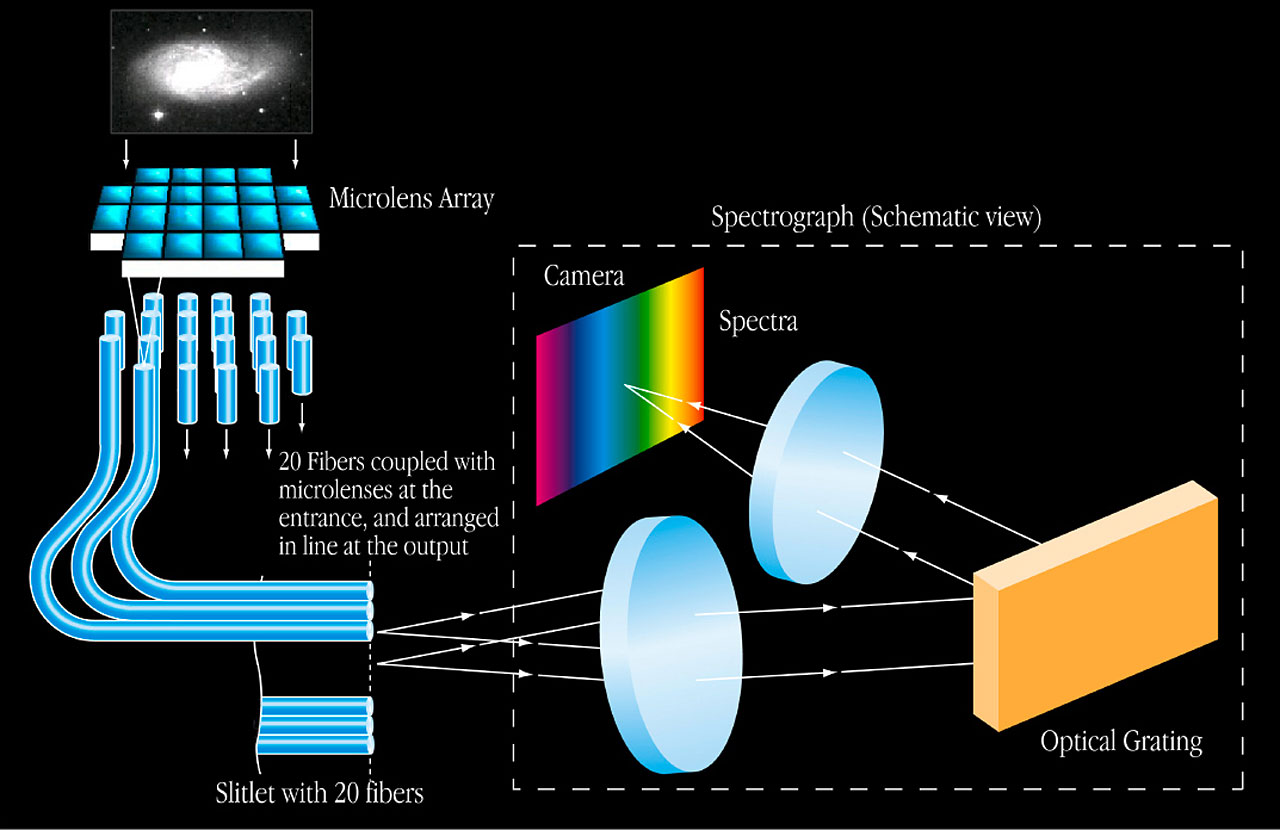
A microlens array used in a spectrograph

A microlens is a small lens, generally with a diameter less than a millimetre (mm) and often as small as 10 micrometres (μm). The small sizes of the lenses means that a simple design can give good optical quality but sometimes unwanted effects arise due to optical diffraction at the small features. A typical microlens may be a single element with one plane surface and one spherical convex surface to refract the light. Because micro-lenses are so small, the substrate that supports them is usually thicker than the lens and this has to be taken into account in the design. More sophisticated lenses may use aspherical surfaces and others may use several layers of optical material to achieve their design performance.

A different type of microlens has two flat and parallel surfaces and the focusing action is obtained by a variation of refractive index across the lens. These are known as gradient-index (GRIN) lenses. Some micro-lenses achieve their focusing action by both a variation in refractive index and by the surface shape.

Another class of microlens, sometimes known as micro-Fresnel lenses, focus light by refraction in a set of concentric curved surfaces. Such lenses can be made very thin and lightweight. Binary-optic micro-lenses focus light by diffraction. They have grooves with stepped edges or multilevels that approximate the ideal shape. They have advantages in fabrication and replication by using standard semiconductor processes such as photolithography and reactive-ion etching (RIE).

Micro-lens arrays contain multiple lenses formed in a one-dimensional or two-dimensional array on a supporting substrate. If the individual lenses have circular apertures and are not allowed to overlap, they may be placed in a hexagonal array to obtain maximum coverage of the substrate. However, there will still be gaps between the lenses which can only be reduced by making the micro-lenses with non-circular apertures. With optical sensor arrays, tiny lens systems serve to focus and concentrate the light onto the photo-diode surface, instead of allowing it to fall on non-photosensitive areas of the pixel device. Fill-factor is the ratio of the active refracting area, i.e. that area which directs light to the photo-sensor, to the total contiguous area occupied by the microlens array.

== Fabrication ==
In the 17th century, Robert Hooke and Antonie van Leeuwenhoek both developed techniques to make small glass lenses for use with their microscopes. Hooke melted small filaments of Venetian glass and allowed the surface tension in the molten glass to form the smooth spherical surfaces required for lenses, then mounting and grinding the lenses using conventional methods. The principle has been repeated by performing photolithography into materials such as photoresist or UV curable epoxy and melting the polymer to form arrays of multiple lenses. More recently microlens arrays have been fabricated using convective assembly of colloidal particles from suspension.

Advances in technology have enabled micro-lenses to be designed and fabricated to close tolerances by a variety of methods. In most cases multiple copies are required and these can be formed by moulding or embossing from a master lens array. The master lens array may also be replicated through the generation of an electroform using the master lens array as a mandrel. The ability to fabricate arrays containing thousands or millions of precisely spaced lenses has led to an increased number of applications.

The optical efficiency of diffracting lenses depends on the shape of the groove structure and, if the ideal shape can be approximated by a series of steps or multilevels, the structures may be fabricated using technology developed for the integrated circuit industry, such as wafer-level optics. The study of such diffracting lenses is known as binary optics.

Micro-lenses in recent imaging chips have attained smaller and smaller sizes. The Samsung NX1 mirrorless system camera packs 28.2 million micro-lenses onto its CMOS imaging chip, one per photo-site, each with a side length of just 3.63 micrometer. For smartphones this process is miniaturized even further: The Samsung Galaxy S6 has a CMOS sensor with pixels only 1.12 micrometer each. These pixels are covered with micro-lenses of an equally small pitch.

Micro-lenses can be also made from liquids. Recently, a glass-like resilient free-form micro-lenses were realized via ultra-fast laser 3D nanolithography technique. The sustained ~2 GW/cm^{2} intensity for femtosecond pulsed irradiation shows its potential in high power and/or harsh environment applications.

Bio-microlenses have been developed to image biological specimens without causing damage. These can be made from a single cell attached to a fiber probe.

=== Wafer-level optics ===
Wafer-level optics (WLO) enables the design and manufacture of miniaturized optics at the wafer level using advanced semiconductor-like techniques. The end product is cost effective, miniaturized optics that enable the reduced form factor of camera modules for mobile devices.

The technology is scalable from a single-element CIF/VGA lens to a multi-element mega pixel lens structure, where the lens wafers are precision aligned, bonded together and diced to form multi-element lens stacks. As of 2009 the technology was used in about 10 percent of the mobile phone camera lens market.

Semiconductor stacking methodology can now be used to fabricate wafer-level optical elements in a chip scale package. The result is a wafer-level camera module that measures .575 mm x 0.575 mm. The module can be integrated into a catheter or endoscope with a diameter as small as 1.0 mm.

== Applications ==
Single micro-lenses are used to couple light to optical fibres; microlens arrays are often used to increase the light collection efficiency of CCD arrays and CMOS sensors, to collect and focus light that would have otherwise fallen onto the non-sensitive areas of the sensor. Micro-lens arrays are also used in some digital projectors, to focus light to the active areas of the LCD used to generate the image to be projected. Current research also relies on micro-lenses of various types to act as concentrators for high efficiency photovoltaics for electricity production.

Combinations of microlens arrays have been designed that have novel imaging properties, such as the ability to form an image at unit magnification and not inverted as is the case with conventional lenses. Micro-lens arrays have been developed to form compact imaging devices for applications such as photocopiers and mobile-phone cameras.

Another application is in 3D imaging and displays. In 1902, Frederic E. Ives proposed the use of an array of alternately transmitting and opaque strips to define the viewing directions for a pair of interlaced images and hence enable the observer to see a 3D stereoscopic image. The strips were later replaced by Hess with an array of cylindrical lenses known as a lenticular screen, to make more efficient use of the illumination.

Hitachi have 3D displays free of 3D glasses using arrays of microlens to create the stereoscopic effect.

More recently, the availability of arrays of spherical micro-lenses has enabled Gabriel Lippmann's idea for integral photography to be explored and demonstrated. Colloidal micro-lenses have also enabled single molecule detection when used in conjunction with a long working distance, low light collection efficiency objective lens.

Micro-lens arrays are also used by Lytro to achieve light field photography (plenoptic camera) that eliminates the need for initial focusing prior to capturing images. Instead, focus is achieved in software during post-processing.

== Characterization ==
In order to characterize micro-lenses it is necessary to measure parameters such as the focal length and quality of transmitted wavefront. Special techniques and new definitions have been developed for this.

For example, because it is not practical to locate the principal planes of such small lenses, measurements are often made with respect to the lens or substrate surface. Where a lens is used to couple light into an optical fibre the focused wavefront may exhibit spherical aberration and light from different regions of the microlens aperture may be focused to different points on the optical axis. It is useful to know the distance at which the maximum amount of light is concentrated in the fibre aperture and these factors have led to new definitions for focal length. To enable measurements on micro-lenses to be compared and parts to be interchanged, a series of international standards has been developed to assist users and manufacturers by defining microlens properties and describing appropriate measurement methods.

== Micro-optics in nature ==
Examples of micro-optics are to be found in nature ranging from simple structures to gather light for photosynthesis in leaves to compound eyes in insects. As methods of forming micro-lenses and detector arrays are further developed, the ability to mimic optical designs found in nature will lead to new compact optical systems.

== See also ==
- Lenticular lens
- Integral imaging
- Plenoptic camera
