= Andrey Gershun =

- Born: Andrey Aleksandrovich Gershun; 22 October 1903; Saint Petersburg
- Died: 6 December 1952 (aged 49); Saint Petersburg
- Education: Saint Petersburg State University
- Scientific career
- Fields: Physics, Optics
- Workplaces: Vavilov State Optical Institute

Andrey Aleksandrovich Gershun (Russian: Андре́й Алекса́ндрович Ге́ршун, 22 October 1903 – 6 December 1952) was a Soviet physicist known for his work in photometry and optics, and was one of the founders of Vavilov State Optical Institute Hydrooptics Science School.

== Biography ==
Andrey Aleksandrovich Gershun was born in 1903 in the family of Russian physicist Aleksandr L'vovich Gershun. After his father's death in 1915 he lived with his mother Rozaliya Feliksovna Gershun. In 1920 he entered the Physics Department of Peterburg State University and graduated in 1924. He then took a position in the State Optical Institute Photometric Laboratory under the direction of Professor S. O. Mayzel'.

In 1934, when the Photometric sector was organised at the State Optical Institute, Gershun took the position of the head of the Lighting Laboratory. His colleagues included well-known physicists M. M. Gurevich (head of the Photometric Laboratory), L. I. Demkin (head of the Color Laboratory), Lev Gassovsky (head of the Eye Laboratory) and G. K. Ustyugov (head of the Flood Lamp Laboratory). He also worked with D. N. Lazarev, G. N. Rautian, and A. A. Vol'kenshteyn. Their collaborations led progress at the institute in photometry, lighting technology, colorimetry, ophthalmology and the physiology of the eye. In 1937 Gershun received the Doctor nauk degree.

During World War II the State Optical Institute was evacuated to Yoshkar-Ola (1941–1945). During this period Gershun worked on the problems of blackout, camouflage detection and concealed lighting.

After the end of World War II he continued his work on photometric problems and performed theoretical and translational research. He also occupied lecturer positions. He died December 6, 1952, in his office.

== Scientific work ==
Gershun's most important pre-war works were devoted to theoretical photometry, lighting technology and electric light usage problems. For instance, he developed methods of economical production area lighting, class rooms lighting. He developed Russian photometric terminology. In 1936 he finished his theory of the light field and published a monograph "The Light Field", that was translated to English and published in the USA. During his research of the light field Gershun published a paper, devoted to one of the fundamental units, characterizing optical tool light penetrability.

Gershun's papers on daylight illumination became the basis of new branch of applied science — Construction Lighting Technology. One such paper concerns rational illumination of film production, A second one is devoted to design of the Palace of the Soviets illumination. After this paper Gershun was appointed to head the Palace of the Soviets Illumination Project.

Gershun and his colleagues designed many hydrophotometric and optical devices for measuring brightness, transparency, scattering pattern and polarization of sea water. Also, Gershun took part in many expeditions and underwater experiments. The most fundamental results of Gershun work were published in the monograph "Transparency and Color of the Sea."

During World War II Gershun worked on blackout, camouflage detection and concealed lighting problems, and on the precision of optical devices. He calculated effective searchlight luminosity and was first to propose a method of small luminosity measurements with equivalent luminosity. Equivalent Luminosity Unit later was included in the International Lighting Vocabulary.

After World War II Gershun worked on a luminous intensity measurement method and published several papers devoted to theoretical aspects of fade light photometry.

In 1948, following the 250th birthday of Pierre Bouguer, Andrey Gershun became the editor of Bouguer's most famous paper translation. Gershun did not only take part in editing, but also added a complete biography and bibliography of Pierre Bouguer.

The last papers of Gershun were devoted to black body radiation spectrum density and rough surface light scattering. In 1952 he started working on a book "Theoretical Basis of Lighting", but never finished.

The complete bibliography of Gershun holds more than 90 papers and books. In 1958 his collected papers were published.

== Pedagogical and social work ==
Gershun paid serious attention to the students' education. He was a lecturer at The National Mineral Resources University, Saint Petersburg State Electrotechnical University, The Civil Air Engineering Institute, Military Electrotechnical Academy, Naval Academy and Zhukovsky Air Force Engineering Academy. He was professor of Leningrad Technical School for Precise Mechanics and Optics and, after the Technical School reorganization into ITMO University, he occupied the Head of the Physical Optics Department position from 1946 till 1952. He was one of the founders of ITMO Physical Optics Laboratory. He read lectures on Physics, Physical Optics, Lighting, Photometry, Colorimetry, etc. He served as supervisor of PhD students, introduced undergraduate students to science problems, and gave scientific seminars.

From the end of 1920 Gershun was a member of Lighting Engineering Committee under the direction of M. A. Shatelen. He was a director of the Leningrad Office of USSR Laboratory Lighting Engineering Society and of the Lighting Engineering Board of USSR Electric Engineering Society. He was a member of editorial board of "Lighting Engineering" Journal. From 1947 until his death Gershun was administrative assistant of the Lighting Engineering Committee Engineering Science Board of USSR Science Academy Chairman M. A. Shatelen.

== Honors ==
- Stalin Prize (1942, 29.10.1949)
- Order of the Red Star (1942)
- Order of the Badge of Honour (1945)
- Order of the Red Banner of Labour (29.10.1949)
