= Lytro =

Light field camera company

Lytro, Inc.

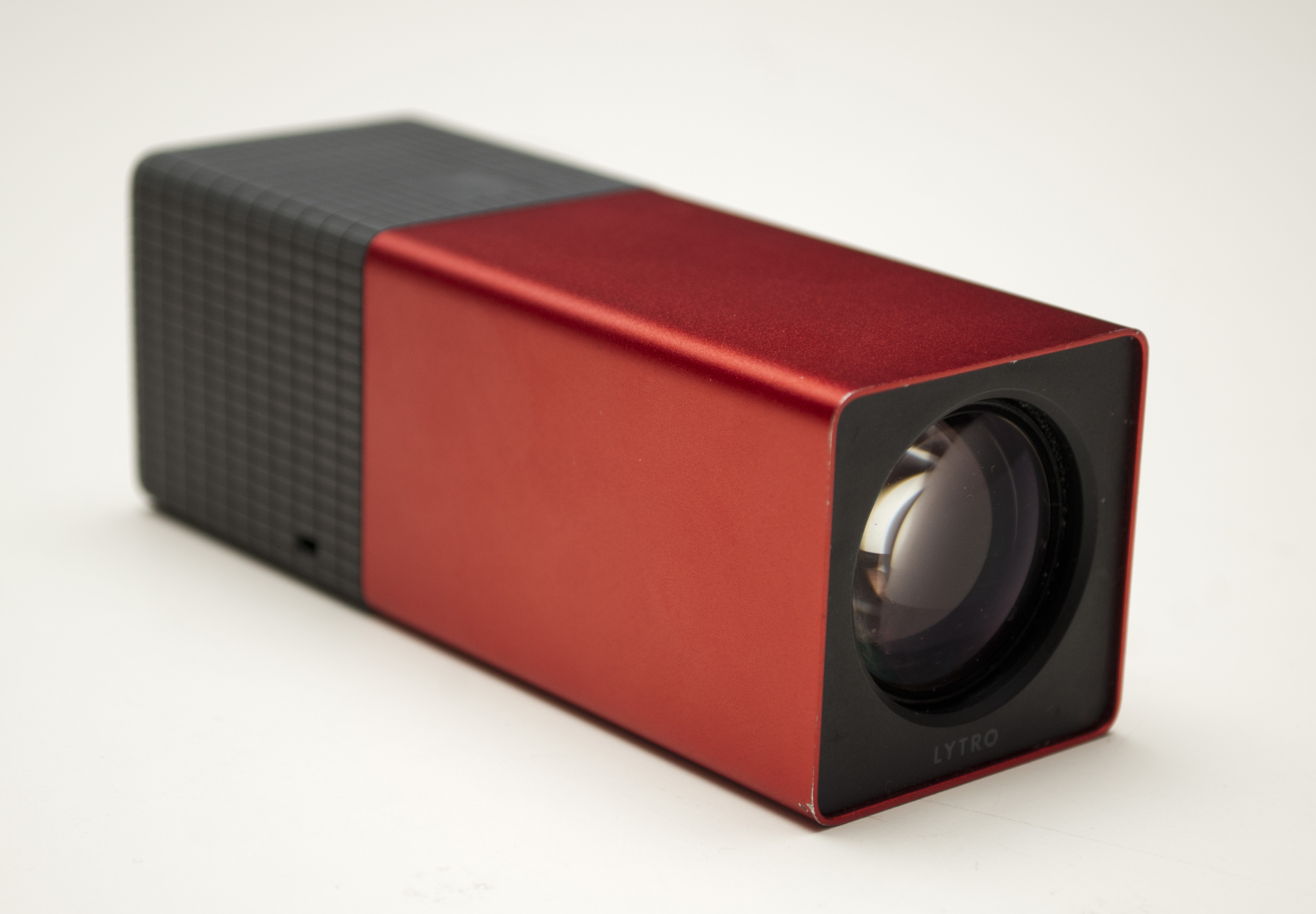
- Lytro light field camera from 2014
- Type: Private
- Industry: Digital cameras
- Founded: 2006
- Founder: Ren Ng
- Defunct: March 27, 2018
- Headquarters: Mountain View, CA
- Key people: Ren Ng, Executive Chairman; Kurt Akeley, CTO; Jason Rosenthal, CEO
- Products: Light-field camera

Lytro, Inc. was an American company founded in 2006 by Ren Ng which developed some of the first commercially available light-field cameras. The company would release its first-generation camera in 2012, before releasing the Illum in 2014, a more advanced camera targeted towards professional photographers. In 2015, the company pivoted to release the Immerge, a high-end camera designed for capturing virtual reality environments.

Lytro ceased operations in late March 2018, with many former employees transferring to work at Google.

== History ==
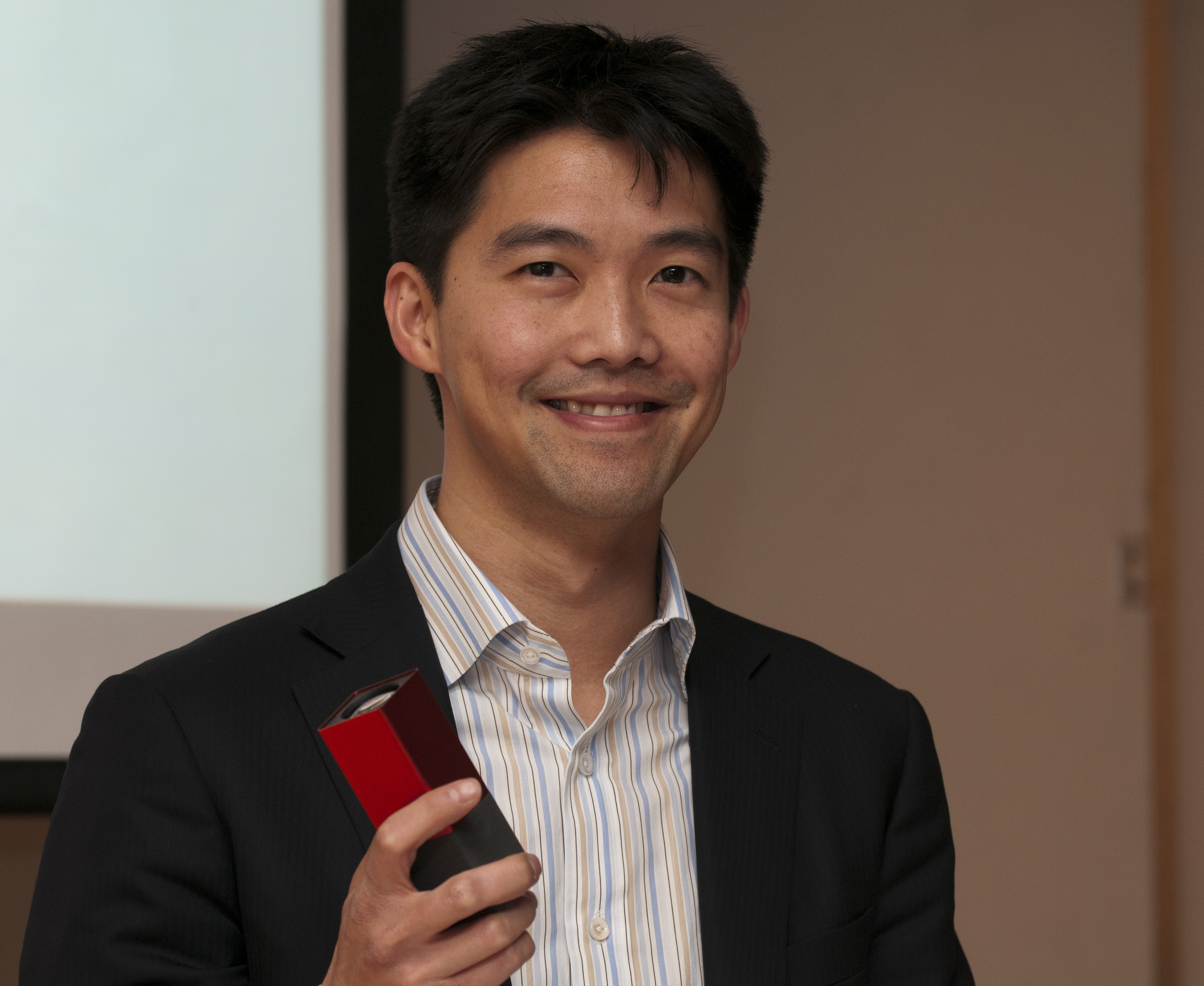
Ren Ng, Lytro original CEO and founder, holding a Lytro camera.

While he was a researcher at Stanford, Ren Ng was photographing a friend's daughter and noticed, "it was incredibly difficult to focus the image properly and capture her fleeting smile in just the right way". After completing his Ph.D, Ng decided to use his experience in light field research to "start a company that would produce light-field cameras that everyone could enjoy." The company was originally named Refocus Imaging, before launching as Lytro.

Lytro board members included Ben Horowitz, general partner at Andreessen Horowitz; Patrick Chung, partner at NEA; and TiVo cofounder Mike Ramsay, with Charles Chi of Greylock Partners serving as Executive Chairman. Advisors included Intuit cofounder Scott Cook, VMware cofounder Diane Greene, Dolby Labs chairman Peter Gotcher and Sling Media cofounder Blake Krikorian.

In June 2011, Apple Inc CEO Steve Jobs purportedly met with Ng to discuss improvements for the iPhone camera.

Lytro founder Ng was Lytro's first CEO. Lytro's Chief Technology Officer Kurt Akeley was a founding member of Silicon Graphics. In June 2012 Ng announced that he would be changing roles and be Lytro's Executive Chairman focused on innovation. Charles Chi would change from Executive Chairman to interim CEO while Lytro's board began looking for a new CEO.

Lytro began shipping its first generation pocket-sized camera, capable of refocusing images after being taken, in 8 GB and 16 GB versions on February 29, 2012. In April 2014, the company announced Lytro Illum, its second generation camera for commercial and experimental photographers. The Lytro Illum was released at $1,600. The Illum has a permanently attached 30–250mm (35mm equivalent) f/2.0 lens and an articulated rear screen.

In 2015, Lytro laid off around twenty percent of its workforce to refocus on virtual reality (VR) applications. They announced Immerge, a very-high-end VR video capture camera with a companion custom compute server. Immerge was expected to ship in 2016, and be useful to studios trying to combine CGI-based VR with video VR. By this point, the company had received $140 million in 4 rounds from 8 investors.

On March 27, 2018, Lytro announced that it was shutting down operations. It was initially reported by TechCrunch that the company would be acquired by Google, but it was later clarified that Google would only take on a "large fraction" of Lytro employees and some corporate assets, with no plans to continue usage of Lytro's technologies. As of November 2018, the original Lytro website lytro.com redirected to Raytrix, a German manufacturer of scientific light field cameras.

== Products ==
=== Original camera ===
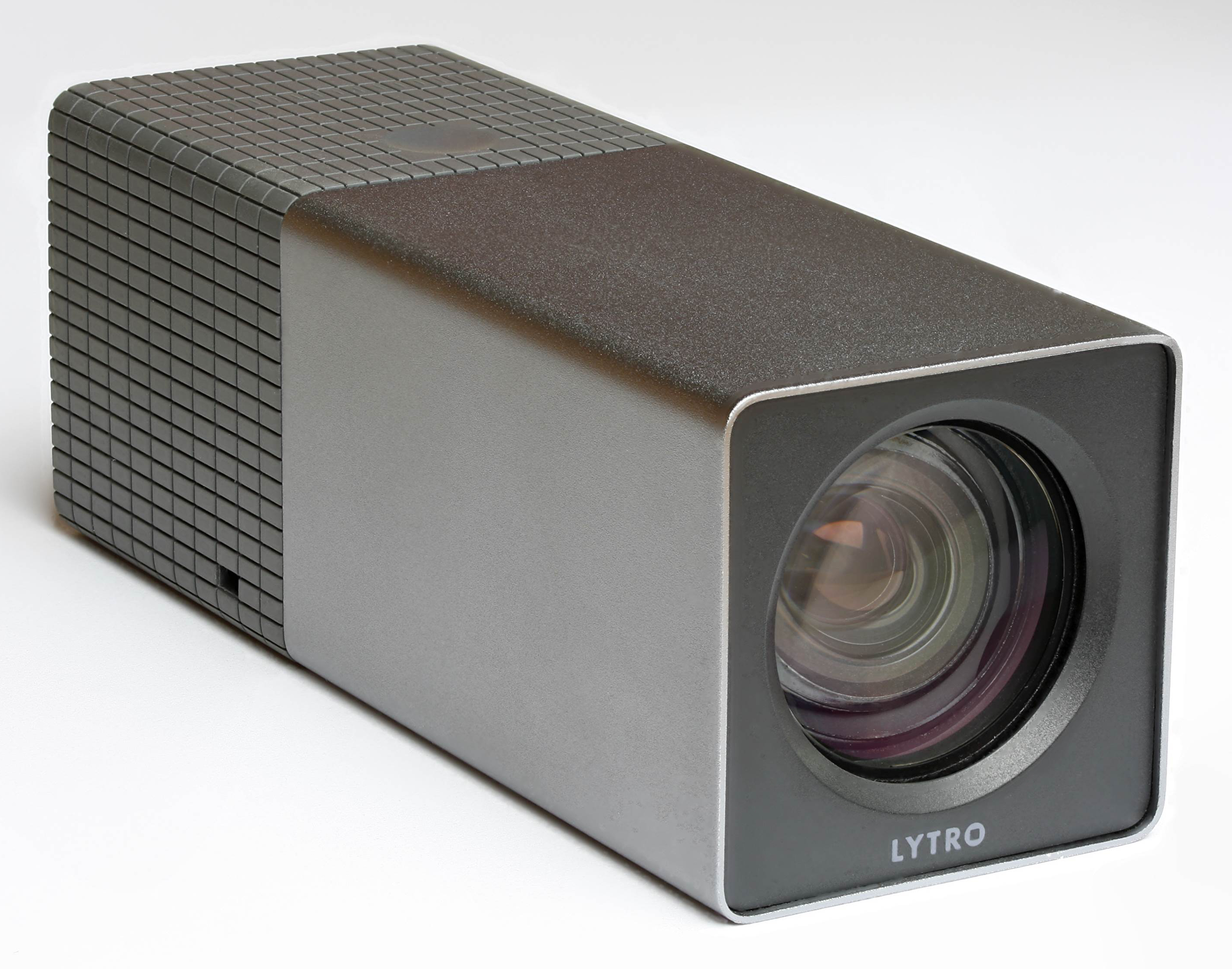
The original Lytro camera was designed by NewDealDesign.

The original camera is a square tube less than five inches long with a lens opening at one end and a 1.52-inch (38.6 mm) LCD touch screen at the other. The original camera features an 11 megaray sensor. The lens has 8x optical zoom and an f/2.0 aperture. The first generation of the camera comes in two options: one with 8GB of memory (which can hold 350 pictures) and one with 16GB (which can hold 750 pictures). Megaray is a measurement Lytro uses to describe how many megapixels are in the sensor beneath a microlens array. Raw data is processed to produce photographs with a resolution of 1.2 megapixels.

=== Lytro Illum ===
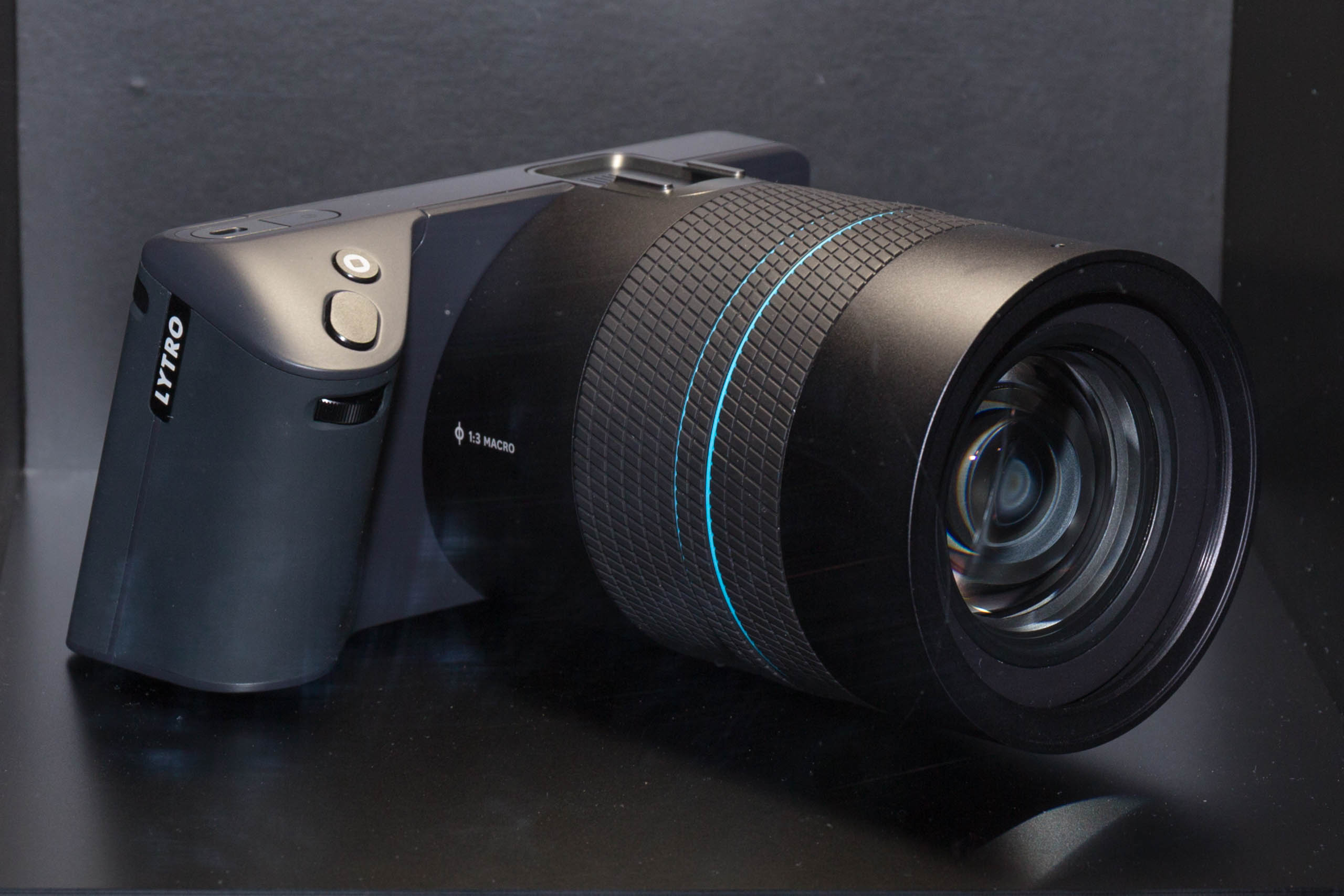
Lytro ILLUM 2015 CP+

The Lytro ILLUM features a 40 megaray sensor (in comparison to the original Lytro Camera's 11 megaray sensor), and a more powerful processor. The 30-250mm lens has 8.3x optical zoom, an f/2.0 aperture, and 1:3 macro focus capability. The lens was designed to weigh half a pound to make the camera lighter and more agile. The Illum features a 1,152,000 pixel articulated 4-inch (101.6 mm) LCD touchscreen with a wide aspect ratio. A display overlay shows the photographer the relative focus of all objects in the frame, and which elements are re-focusable. The camera has an SD/SDHC/SDXC card slot and no internal storage. It also features a USB 3.0 port, external shutter release port, hot shoe, tripod mount, and removable battery. The CMOS image sensor measures 1/2-inch (6.4 x 4.8 mm) and the sensitivity can be varied from ISO 80 to 3200.

=== Lytro Immerge ===
On November 5, 2015, Lytro announced Immerge, an end-to-end system for capturing light fields for use in creating virtual reality (VR) content. It used a companion server mounted on a small and portable 19-inch rack due to the amount of data it captured.

== Technology ==
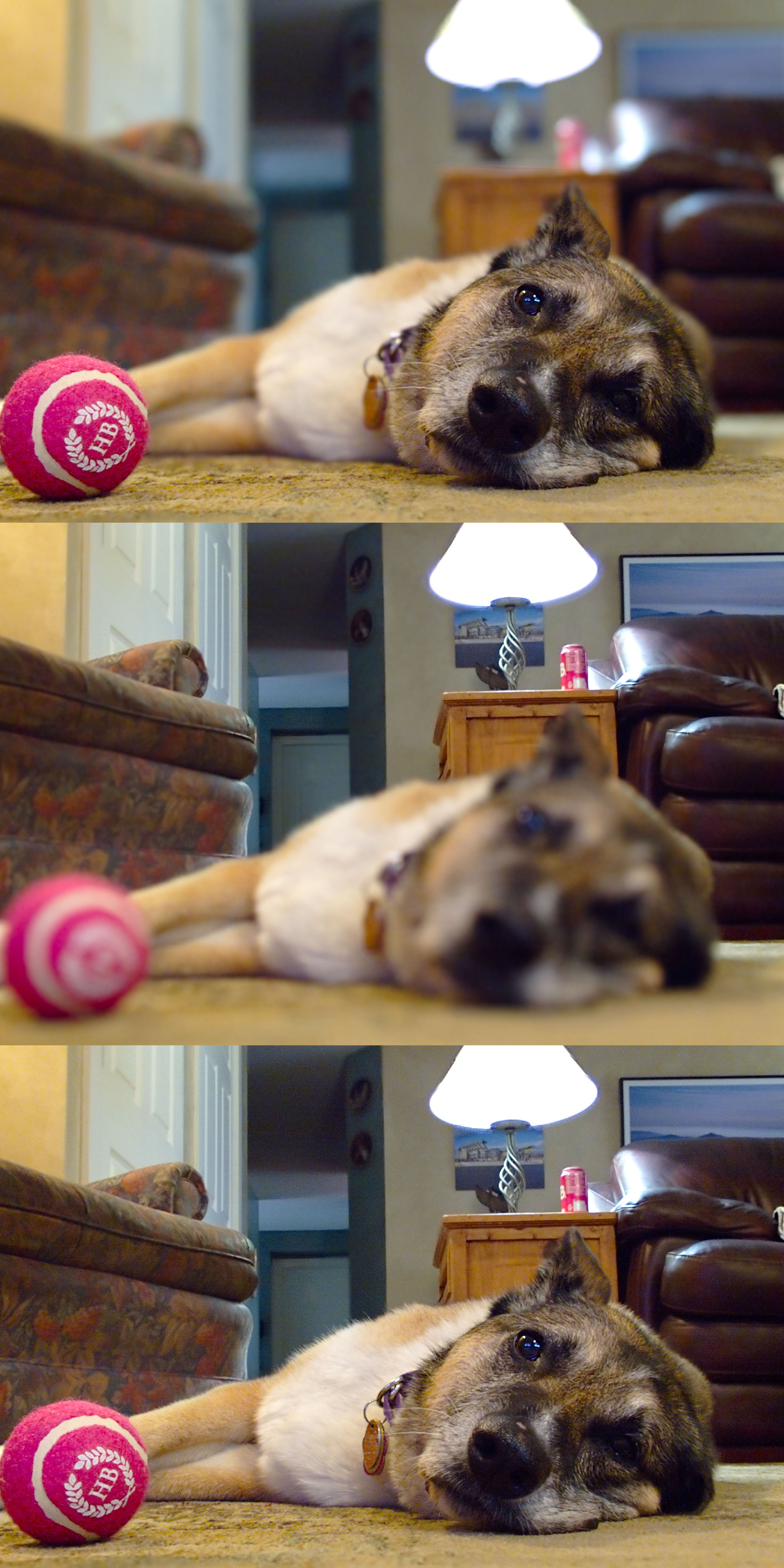
This demonstrates the capability of changing the focal distance and depth of field after a photo is taken - Near focus (top), Far focus (middle), Full depth of field (bottom) - using the Lytro Illum light field camera software

Lytro cameras can capture a light field that can represent light in 3D more accurately, but typically only display the content on a 2D screen. This happens either on the device itself or on a connected computer. Some of the impact of the true innovations in the capture portion of the devices were not used to their full potential due to the lack of support for 3D displays.

== See also ==
- Telecentric lens
- Reflectance paper
- Raytrix
