= Lippmann electrometer =

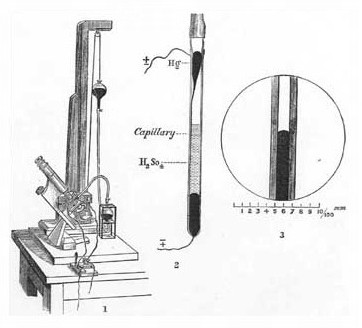
Drawing of a Lippmann electrometer

A Lippmann electrometer is a device for detecting small rushes of electric current and was invented by Gabriel Lippmann in 1873. The device consists of a tube which is thick on one end and very thin on the other. The thin end is designed to act as a capillary tube. The tube is half-filled with mercury with a small amount of dilute sulfuric acid above the mercury in the capillary tube. Metal wires are connected at the thick end into the mercury and at the thin end into the sulfuric acid.

When the pulse of electricity arrives it changes the surface tension of the mercury and allows it to leap up a short distance in the capillary tube. This device was used in the first practical ECG machine which was invented by Augustus Desiré Waller.

== See also ==
- Electrocapillarity
