= Integral imaging =

3D imaging technique

Integral imaging is a three-dimensional imaging technique that captures and reproduces a light field by using a two-dimensional array of microlenses (or lenslets), sometimes called a fly's-eye lens, normally without the aid of a larger overall objective or viewing lens. In capture mode, in which a film or detector is coupled to the microlens array, each microlens allows an image of the subject as seen from the viewpoint of that lens's location to be acquired. In reproduction mode, in which an object or source array is coupled to the microlens array, each microlens allows each observing eye to see only the area of the associated micro-image containing the portion of the subject that would have been visible through that space from that eye's location. The optical geometry can perhaps be visualized more easily by substituting pinholes for the microlenses, as has actually been done for some demonstrations and special applications.

A display using integral imaging is a type of light field display.

The result is a visual reproduction complete with all significant depth cues, including parallax in all directions, perspective that changes with the position and distance of the observer, and, if the lenses are small enough and the images of sufficient quality, the cue of accommodation — the adjustments of eye focus required to clearly see objects at different distances. Unlike the voxels in a true volumetric display, the image points perceived through the microlens array are virtual and have only a subjective location in space, allowing a scene of infinite depth to be displayed without resorting to an auxiliary large magnifying lens or mirror.

Integral imaging was partly inspired by barrier grid autostereograms and in turn partly inspired lenticular printing.

== Etymology ==
Inventor Gabriel Lippmann called the technique "photographie intégrale" (in French). It is usually translated literally as "integral photography", which suggests the integration of a whole image from parts of many small ones. However, a more usual meaning of the French word "intégrale" is "complete" or "unabridged", so that "complete photography" is another valid translation of Lippmann's perhaps deliberately ambiguous name for it.

== History ==
On March 2, 1908 Nobel prize winning French physicist Gabriel Lippmann presented his ideas for "Photographie intégrale", based on insect eyes. He was probably also inspired by the barrier grid autostereograms of Frederic Ives and Eugène Estanave, representing Estanave at several presentations of Estanave's works at the French Academy of Sciences. Lippmann suggested to use a screen of tiny lenses. Spherical segments should be pressed into a sort of film with photographic emulsion on the other side. The screen would be placed inside a lightproof holder and on a tripod for stability. When exposed each tiny lens would function as a camera and record the surroundings from a slightly different angle than neighboring lenses. When developed and lit from behind the lenses should project the life-size image of the recorded subject in space. He could not yet present concrete results in March 1908, but by the end of 1908 he claimed to have exposed some Integral photography plates and to have seen the "resulting single, full-sized image". However, the technique remained experimental since no material or technique seemed to deliver the optical quality desired. At the time of his death in 1921 Lippmann reportedly had a system with only twelve lenses.

Eugène Estanave performed further experiments with Lippmann's technique. He exhibited an integral photograph in 1925 and published about his findings in La Nature. In 1930 he had 432 lenses in a 6.5 x 9 cm plate with viewable results, but then abandoned the lenticular screen and continued his integral photography experiments with pinholes.

Louis Lumière worked on integral photography and corresponded with Lippman about the technique. Lumière patented a system a few years after Lippmann's death, but never seems to have actually manufactured lenticular screens.

== Integral video ==
- 2010 Japan's NHK broadcasting company and Toshiba each showed a demo featuring a prototype display view-able with a 25 degree window.
- 2015 "Looking glass factory" started work on their multiscopic display, the latest is based around an 8k screen showing 45 different possible angles simultaneously

== See also ==
- Autostereoscopy
- Lenticular printing
- Focus stacking
- Plenoptic camera
- 3D display
- Stereoscopy
