= Light-in-flight imaging =

Techniques for visualizing the propagation of a light ray

500 ps laser pulse propagation in air visualized by a single-photon detector arrays

A video demonstrating a superluminal light-in-flight observation captured with megapixel SPAD camera

Light-in-flight imaging is a set of techniques to visualize the propagation of light through different media.

== History and techniques ==
Light was first captured in its flight by Nils Abramson in 1978, who used a holographic technique to record the wavefront of a pulse propagating and being scattered by a white-painted screen placed in its path. This high-speed recording technique allowed the dynamic observation of light phenomena like reflection, interference, and focusing that are normally observed statically. More recently, light-in-flight holography has been performed in a scattering medium rather than using a reflective screen. Light can also be captured in motion in a scattering medium using a streak camera that has picosecond temporal resolution, thus removing the need for interferometry and coherent illumination, but requiring additional hardware to raster scan the two-dimensional (2D) scene, which increases the acquisition time to hours.

A few other techniques possess the temporal resolution to observe light in motion as it illuminates a scene, such as photonic mixer devices based on modulated illumination, albeit with a temporal resolution limited to a few nanoseconds. Alternatively, time-encoded amplified imaging can record images at the repetition rate of a laser by exploiting wavelength-encoded illumination of a scene and amplified detection through a dispersive fibre, albeit with 160 ns temporal and spatial resolution.

Recent studies based on computer tomography using data from multiple probe pulses enabled reconstruction of picosecond pulse propagation phenomena in condensed media.

In 2015, a method to visualize events evolving on picosecond time scales based on single-photon detector arrays has been demonstrated.

== See also ==
- Femto-photography
