= Raytrix =

Camera company

Raytrix GmbH
- Industry: Photography, Technology
- Founders: Christian Perwass, Lennart Wietzke
- Headquarters: Germany
- Products: Plenoptic cameras
- Website: raytrix.de

Raytrix GmbH is a German company founded by Christian Perwass and Lennart Wietzke that was the first to create and market commercial plenoptic cameras. The R5 camera produces images of 1 megapixel resolution, while the R11 produces 3 megapixel images.

Unlike Lytro, which initially targeted the consumer market, the main market of Raytrix's cameras is industrial and scientific applications where depth information of each pixel can be more useful.

== See also ==
- Lytro
- 4D light field
