= Charles Chi =

Canadian businesspeople

- Occupation: Carleton University

Charles Chi is an entrepreneur and venture investor. He served as chancellor of Carleton University from 2011 to 2017.

== Biography ==
Chi has had a diverse career in engineering, marketing, sales, and executive leadership. Most recently, he has been an investor in early-stage technology start-up companies. Since graduating from Carleton University with a Bachelor of Systems and Computer Engineering in 1988, he has worked with Bell Canada and Unitel in engineering, later moving to marketing.

Moving to California's Silicon Valley in 1995, Chi joined Stratacom, subsequently Cisco, after Cisco's acquisition of the company. He then co-founded Lightera Networks. When Lightera was acquired by Ciena, Chi became Ciena's vice-president of marketing.

In 2000, Chi joined Greylock Partners, one of the original venture capital firms in the United States. As a partner and board member, he invested in early-stage technology startups engaged in hardware and software business throughout the world. These startups include companies located in the U.S., Israel, and Canada that have since been acquired by Microsoft, Broadcom, Microchip, and McData.

While at Greylock Partners, Chi seeded Lytro, a Mountain View, California company specializing in a light field digital camera for consumer use. The Lytro camera captures the direction of light, producing images with multi-dimensional space, allowing photographs to be refocused and perspective to be shifted after they have been taken. At Lytro, Chi served as executive chairman from May 2010 to July 2012 and interim CEO from July 2012 to April 2013.

Chi was appointed as Carleton University's 11th chancellor in August 2011, being formally installed in June 2012. President Roseann Runte noted that Chi would "inspire students to pursue their dreams through his example of hard work, dedication and strategic thinking. He epitomizes the global Canadian, at home around the world." He served in this role until 2017.
