= Femto-photography =

Technique for recording the propagation of ultrashort light pulses

Schematic of the active CUSP system for 70-Tfps imaging

Femto-photography is a technique for recording the propagation of ultrashort pulses of light through a scene at a very high speed (up to 10^{13} frames per second). A femto-photograph is equivalent to an optical impulse response of a scene and has also been denoted by terms such as a light-in-flight recording or transient image. Femto-photography of macroscopic objects was first demonstrated using a holographic process in the 1970s by Nils Abramsson at the Royal Institute of Technology (Sweden). A research team at the MIT Media Lab led by Ramesh Raskar, together with contributors from the Graphics and Imaging Lab at the Universidad de Zaragoza, Spain, more recently achieved a significant increase in image quality using a streak camera synchronized to a pulsed laser and modified to obtain 2D images instead of just a single scanline.

In their publications, Raskar's team claims to be able to capture exposures so short that light only traverses 0.6 mm (corresponding to 2 picoseconds, or 2×10^{−12} seconds) during the exposure period, a figure that is in agreement with the nominal resolution of the Hamamatsu streak camera model C5680, on which their experimental setup is based. Recordings taken using the setup have reached significant spread in the mainstream media, including a presentation by Raskar at TEDGlobal 2012. Furthermore, the team was able to demonstrate the reconstruction of unknown objects "around corners", i.e., outside the line of sight of light source and camera, from femto-photographs.

In 2013, researchers at the University of British Columbia demonstrated a computational technique that allows the extraction of transient images from time-of-flight sensor data without the need for ultrafast light sources or detectors.

== Other uses of the term ==
Prior to the aforementioned work, the term "femto-photography" had been used for certain proposed procedures in experimental nuclear physics.
