= Reflectance paper =

Reflectance paper is a surface that contains a lattice of mirrored dimples.

== Design ==
The paper is printed with color and the angle-dependent reflectance function for each pixel of an image captured with a light field camera such as a Lytro. The image displays differently depending on the angle of incident light in the viewing environment. This technique can be used to display the image of a sculpture with its direction-dependent shadow depending on the angle of the light.

== History ==
In 2012, researchers at the University of California, Santa Cruz, Hewlett-Packard Laboratories and 3M created the first type of this kind of paper using a hexagonal lattice of millimeter-sized dimples. Dimple depth was 50μm, representing 70% of a hemisphere. Mirroring used silver or sputtered aluminum. A 32×32 matrix of light-field information was printed on a transparent mask over the dimples.
