= Lev Gassovsky =

Soviet professor

Lev Nikolaevich Gassovsky (1894 – 1989) was a Soviet professor in physical and mathematical sciences. He wrote The Eye and Effectiveness of Its Work and also worked on chapters in reference books for opto-mechanical engineers, several manuals on military optics and more than 90 scientific works.

== Biography ==
In 1918, Gassovsky graduated from the Leningrad (Petrograd) State University. He went on to the German Higher School of Optics in Jena, from where he graduated in 1927. He worked as a physics teacher at the Leningrad Labor School (1918–1919) and the Military Engineering Academy (1922–25). He also was an assistant at the Pedagogical Institute (1919-1923), an associate professor at the Mining Institute (1921-1923), an associate professor at the Electro-Mechanical Institute (1930-1932), and a consultant at the Union Association of Opto-Mechanical Industry (1934-1936). Gassovsky worked at the Leningrad Institute of Precision Mechanics and Optics (LIPMO) as an associate professor and the Head of the Laboratory Devices and Microscopes Department (1930-1941). He was the dean of the evening institute within LIPMO (1932-1933). Gassovsky also became the founder and head of the Physiological Optics and Eyewear (1934). From 1936 to 1941, Gassovsky held a position as the executive editor of the journal “The works of the Leningrad Institute of Precision Mechanics and Optics”. – Moscow-Leningrad: Department of Scientific and Technical Information, People's Commissariat of the Tank Industry of the USSR, the Chief Editorial board of literature on engineering and metal working, the General Board of institutions. Gassovsky made significant contributions in the development of Soviet ophthalmic and physiological optics. He was awarded with the Order of Lenin (1953), the Order of Honor (1943) and other USSR medals.
