= Kirchhoff–Helmholtz integral =

The Kirchhoff–Helmholtz integral combines the Helmholtz equation with the Kirchhoff integral theorem to produce a method applicable to acoustics, seismology and other disciplines involving wave propagation.

It states that the sound pressure is completely determined within a volume free of sources, if sound pressure and velocity are determined in all points on its surface.

$$\boldsymbol{P}(w,z)=\iint_{dA} \left(G(w,z \vert z') \frac{\partial}{\partial n} P(w,z')- P(w,z') \frac{\partial}{\partial n} G(w,z \vert z') \right)dz'$$

== See also ==
- Kirchhoff integral
