= Streak camera =

Instrument for measuring variation in light pulse intensity over time

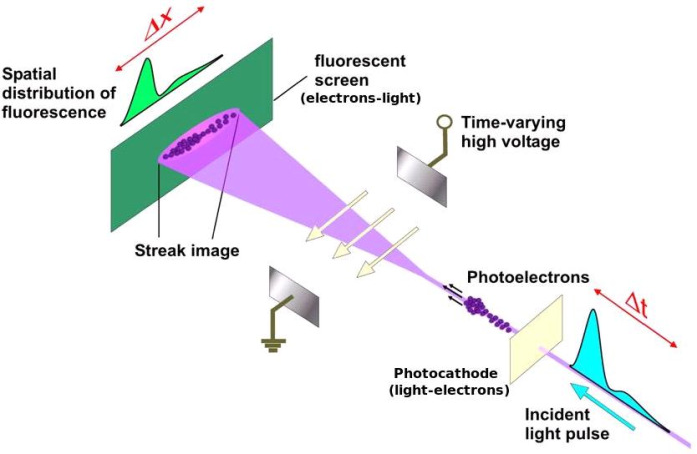
Working principle of a streak camera (here with only a single-point input, yielding only a 1-D image)

A streak camera is an instrument for measuring the variation in a pulse of light's intensity with time. They are used to measure the pulse duration of some ultrafast laser systems and for applications such as time-resolved spectroscopy and LIDAR.

A streak camera forms a 2-D image in which one dimension is distance across its input surface and the other is time, much like a line-scan camera, strip photography, photo finish camera, and others. If the input source is the output of a prism or diffraction grating, the resulting 2-D image shows the entire spectrogram as it varied over time. (An analog oscilloscope can capture changes over continuous time, but it can only record the changes of one point (per channel), in each sweep. A streak camera tracks a continuum of points (effectively hundreds to millions), over continuous time, in each exposure.)

An optoelectronic streak camera, after it is triggered, captures the incoming line image as it changes, usually over an extremely short time. (If extreme speed is not needed, a high-speed camera could be used instead. It captures an entire 2-D scene in each frame, but any unneeded or unuseful information is easily discarded.) The formed 2-D image is then collected (usually at an ordinary speed) before the streak camera is ready to be triggered again.

== Mechanical types ==
Mechanical streak cameras use a rotating mirror or moving slit system to deflect the light beam. They are limited in their maximum scan speed and thus temporal resolution. Film types can acquire unbroken images over extended time, limited only by the length of film.

== Optoelectronic types ==
Optoelectronic streak cameras work by receiving the incoming light on a photocathode, which when hit by photons emits electrons via the photoelectric effect. The electrons are accelerated in a cathode-ray tube and pass through an electric field produced by a pair of plates, which deflects the electrons sideways. By modulating the electric potential between the plates, the electric field is quickly changed to give a time-varying deflection of the electrons, sweeping the electrons across a phosphor screen at the end of the tube. A linear detector, such as a charge-coupled device (CCD) array is used to measure the streak pattern on the screen, and thus the temporal profile of the light pulse.

The time-resolution of the fastest optoelectronic streak cameras is around 180 femtoseconds. Measurement of pulses shorter than this duration requires other techniques such as optical autocorrelation and frequency-resolved optical gating (FROG).

In December 2011, a team at MIT released images combining the use of a streak camera with repeated laser pulses to simulate a movie with a frame rate of one trillion frames per second. This was surpassed in 2020 by a team from Caltech that achieved frame rates of 70 trillion fps.

A camera that receives a 2-D image and jumps it around in one or two dimensions, at a high frame rate, resulting in multiple frames tiled onto a film, an output screen, or an imaging sensor, is a framing camera.

A framing camera that deflects the incoming 2-D image inside a cathode-ray tube (much like an electro-optical streak camera) is an electro-optical framing camera.

== See also ==
- Photo finish, which uses a much slower but 2-dimensional version of a camera mapping time into a spatial dimension
- Femto-photography
