= Dieter Jung (artist) =

German artist

- Born: October 9, 1941 (age 85); Bad Wildungen
- Awards: 1965/66 Fellowship by Institut Français for the École des Beaux Arts Paris. 1967 The German National Merit Foundation (Studienstiftung des Deutschen Volkes). 1968-69 USA Fellowship by German AcademicExchange Service(DAAD); 1977 Artist-in- Residence at”The MacDowell Colony”, Peterborough/ NH, USA. 1978 Artist-in-Residence at”Yaddo”, Saratoga Springs, New York; Grant by Cabin Greek Center for Work and Environmental Studies, New York. 1983 Artist-in-Residence grant, Museum of Holography New York. 1985-86 Rockefeller-Fellow at the Center for Advanced Visual Studies, MIT; Grant by the Council for the Arts MIT. 1988 and 2003 Award by the Shearwater Foundation, USA.

Dieter Jung (born October 9, 1941, in Bad Wildungen, Hessia) is a German artist working in the field of holography, painting and installation art. He lives and works in Berlin.

== Education ==
Dieter Jung was raised in Oberdielfen / Siegen (Province of Westphalia). He studied theology at Kirchliche Hochschule Berlin from 1962 to 1963 and fine arts at the Hochschule für bildende Künste (today Berlin University of the Arts) until 1968. While he was attending the École des Beaux-Arts in Paris he also encountered Arthur Adamov and Alberto Giacometti in 1965. From 1971 to 1974 he studied experimental film at the German Film and Television Academy Berlin.

== Work ==
Jung's first academic post was a guest professorship in 1975 at Universidade Federal da Bahia, Salvador, Brazil. In 1977 he realized his initial holograms "Feathers" at the New York School of Holography (conducted by Sam Moree and Dan Schweitzer). He developed 1977 in collaboration with Donald White from Bell Laboratories in his garage in New Jersey the technical requirements for the first holographic poem, "Hologramm". From 1982 until 1985 he explored with Jody Burns (Holoplate, New Jersey) the efficiency of One-step Rainbow Holography. He created the series "Into the Rainbow", "Present Space" and "Different Space".

Between 1985 and 1989 Jung worked as a research fellow at the Center for Advanced Visual Studies/MIT in Boston (directed by Otto Piene) in connection with the Spatial Imaging Group (directed by Stephen Benton) at the Media Lab/MIT on the cycle of holographic LightMills, which was inspired by Harold Edgerton´s Multiflash photography and relating to ZERO's early work "Silberne Lichtmühle" (Silver Light-Mill). Guest lectures followed at Harvard University and at Sorbonne University, Paris.

1990/91 Jung acted as a member of the founding council at the Academy of Media Arts in Cologne where he served as a professor for creative holography and light art until 2007. From 1992 to 1996 he was a member of the board of trustees of the Center for Art and Media/ZKM in Karlsruhe. In 1996 he directed the international conference and exhibition "Holographic Network: A Visual Journey between Art, Science and Technology" at the Academy of Arts, Berlin.

In 1997–99 he served as a member of the MIT Advisory Council on Art-Science-Technology. The development of Holokinetic Mobiles, HoloMobiles XYZ and TransOptical (Transformation optics) Mobiles is since 1998 one of his fields of activities, as well as the development of Floor Holograms and the research into interactive laser installations since 2002. Oraculum; Light installations: "Strings", "Light in Flight" and "Loops", holographic "TimeCapsules". Since 2010 member of the academic board of advisors of ZERO foundation in Düsseldorf. 2011 member of the International György Kepes Society in Hungary. Since 1970 Jung participated in numerous lectures, workshops and exhibitions throughout the world.

The development of Holokinetic Sculptures "Perpetuum Mobile", HoloMobiles XYZ and TransOptical Mobiles, animated by the kinetic sculptures of Alexander Calder and George Ricky, became since 1998 extended fields of his involvement. After the elaboration of Floor Holograms and interactive Laser installations ("Oraculum – for two lasers and three canvases") he continued creating a variety of Light-works "Strings", "LightFlight", "Loops", holographic "Time Capsules" and the "Particle wave" prints, hence revealing and extending a different perception of motion in space, light and colours.

In 2010 he became a member of the academic board of advisors (now think tank) of ZERO foundation in Düsseldorf, and in 2011 he joined the International György Kepes Society in Hungary. Since 1970 Jung has participated in numerous conferences, workshops and exhibitions throughout the world.

Dieter Jung is one of the pioneers in holographic art. This art, apart from being a form of optical illusion, constitutes a specific phase in the history of Light Art. Illusionist tendencies exist in art since the earliest times and were at certain periods even considered as forming an integral part of Western art. As to the luminous phenomenon with its curious ambiguity between presence and absence it is at the heart of all holographic art and can be compared to our perception of the stars whose physical presence has been superseded by the luminous wave which reaches our eye long after having been emitted. The aesthetics of absence has been the privilege of the mystics of all times, but its metaphysical side is counterbalanced by its scientific connotation in the area of holographic art.

"One of the pioneers in holographic art" (excerpt) written by Frank Popper, Paris 2008 for the exhibition "Invisible-Visible" of Dieter Jung, Today Art Museum Beijing—full text

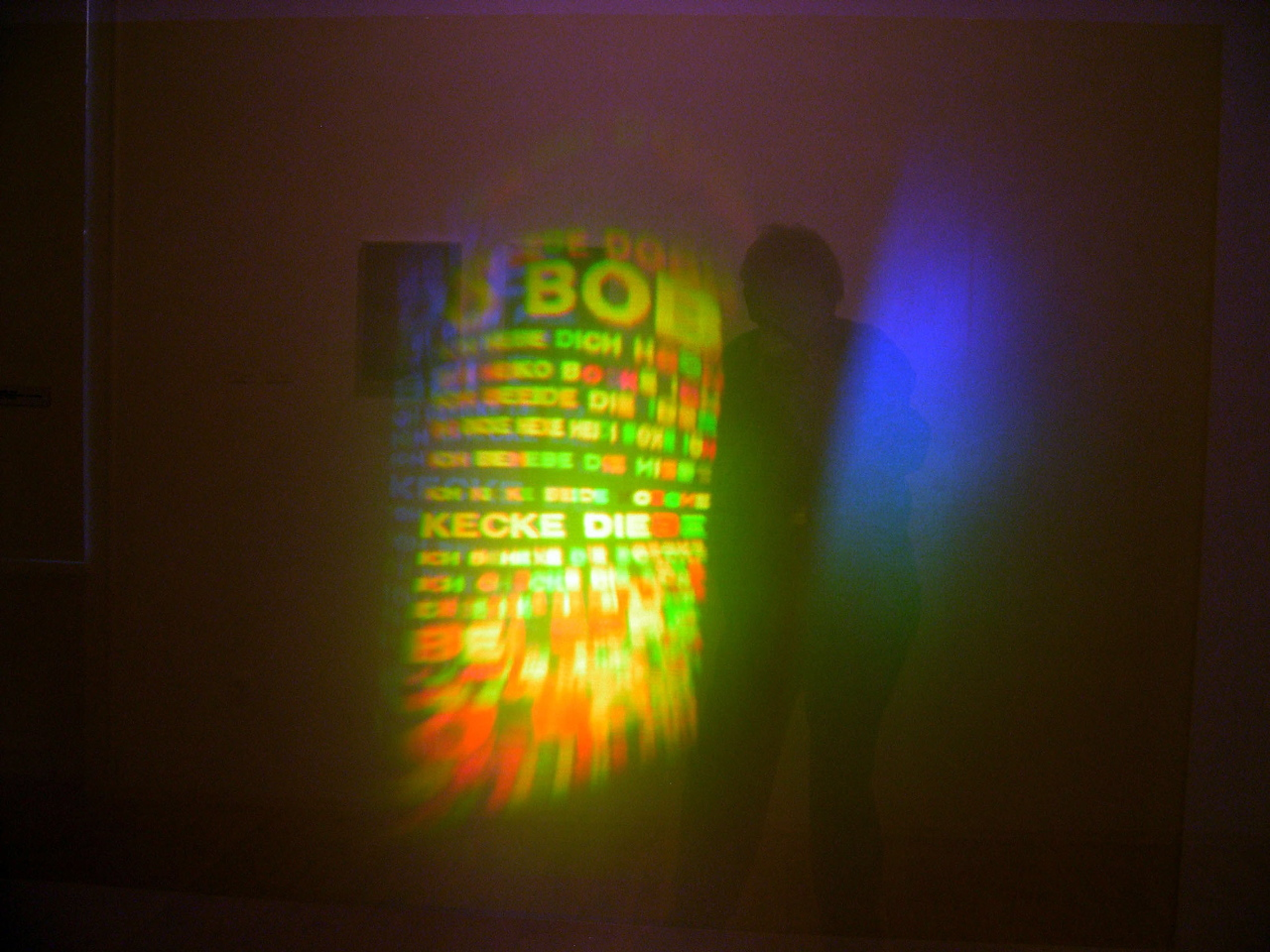
Dieter Jung, BIBI BEI BOB, 1987, Hologram/Glass, 112x140cm. Horizontal symmetric text by Hans Magnus Enzensberger

== Grants and awards ==
Awards: 1965/66 Fellowship by French Institute (Institut Français) for the École des Beaux Arts Paris. 1967 The German National Merit Foundation (Studienstiftung des Deutschen Volkes). 1968–69 USA Fellowship by German Academic Exchange Service (DAAD); 1977 Artist-in- Residence at the MacDowell Colony, Peterborough, New Hampshire, USA. 1978 Artist in Residence at Yaddo, Saratoga Springs, New York; Grant by Cabin Creek Center for Work and Environmental Studies, New York. 1983 Artist-in-Residence grant, Museum of Holography New York. 1984 Stiftung Kunstfonds, 1985–86 Rockefeller-Fellow at the Center for Advanced Visual Studies, MIT; Grant by the Council for the Arts of the MIT. 1988 and 2003 Award by the Shearwater Foundation, USA. 2003 Grant by ZEIT-Stiftung, Ebelin und Gerd Bucerius, Hamburg.

== Solo exhibitions ==
- 1968 Dieter Jung, Galerie Defet, Nuremberg, Germany
- 1973 Galerie Haus Seel, Siegen, Germany
- 1974 Museo de Arte Moderna do Rio de Janeiro, Brazil; Museu de Arte de São Paulo; Dieter Jung, Galeria San Diego, Bogotá, Colombia
- 1975 Bilder: Gemälde-Aquarelle-Bilder-Filme, Haus am Waldsee, Berlin, Germany
- 1977 Asociacion Cultural Humboldt, Caracas, Venezuela
- 1979 Drawings and Paintings, Pointdexter Gallery, New York, N.Y., USA
- 1981 Écriture Holographique, La Revue parlée de Blaise Gautier, Centre Georges Pompidou, Paris, France
- 1982 Goethe House, New York, United States
- 1983 Hara Museum of Contemporary Art, Tokyo, Japan
- 1984 Holography in Art, Hong Kong Arts Center, Hong Kong; Pinturas – Desenhos – Hologramas, Museu de Arte de São Paulo, Brazil.
- 1985 Dieter Jung – Hologrammeja/Piirroksksia/Maalauksia, Näyettey Kluuvin Galleria, Helsinki, Finland; Dieter Jung, Musée de Québec, Quebec City, Canada; Art Basel; Museum of Holography, New York; Dieter Jung-Installation, Museum of Holography, New York, N.Y., USA
- 1986 Center for Advanced Visual Studies (CAVS), MIT, Cambridge, Massachusetts, US
- 1987 Dieter Jung, Galleria Marrozini, San Juan, Puerto Rico
- 1988 Dieter Jung, Paris Art Center, Paris, France
- 1990 Dieter Jung, Hologramme/Zeichnungen, Art Center Zamalek, Cairo, Egypt
- 1991 Dieter Jung, Bilder/Zeichnungen/Hologramme, Kunsthalle Berlin, Berlin, Germany
- 1992 Dieter Jung-Bilder/Zeichnungen/Hologramme, Ulmer Museum, Ulm, Germany; Dieter Jung, Goethe-Institut Madrid, Spain; Palais de Luxembourg, Paris
- 1993 Dieter Jung, Escola das Belas Artes, Salvador, Brazil
- 1998 Dieter Jung, Galerie Schoeller, Düsseldorf, Germany
- 1999 Dieter Jung, Trinitatiskirche, Cologne, Germany
- 2002 Kibela Gallery, Maribor, Slovenia
- 2003 Kun Shan University, Tainan, Taiwan POC; Dieter Jung – Anders als man denkt, Museum im Kulturspeicher, Würzburg, Germany; Kunst-Museum in Ahlen, Germany; Kunstmuseum Heidenheim, Heidenheim, Germany; Dieter Jung, Virtual Images, Kun Shan University, Tainan, Taiwan
- 2004 Dieter Jung, Hologram Works-The extended Space to Dénes Gábor, Ateliers Pro Arte, Budapest, Hungary
- 2005 Shantou University, Guangdong, China; Dieter Jung, The Garden of Light, Taipei Fine Arts Museum Taipei POC
- 2006 Zendai Museum of Modern Art Shanghai; Dieter Jung, The Passion of Light, Zendai /Himalaya Museum of Modern Art, Shanghai, China
- 2007 A-Space Beijing; Beijing; Imperial City Art Museum, Beijing; Dieter Jung- Installation, Goethe Institut Shanghai, China; Dieter Jung, Holographie und Lichtkunst, Cubus Kunsthalle, Duisburg, Germany; Dieter Jung, Looking Forward- Multimedia Holography and LightArt, A-Space Beijing, China; Beijing Imperial City Art Museum, Beijing, China
- 2008 Phases/Faces, Oroom Gallery, Seoul, Korea; Dieter Jung – Invisible-Visible, Today Art Museum, Beijing, China
- 2009 Dieter Jung, Fliegende Farben, Städt. Galerie Haus Seel, Siegen, Germany; Dieter Jung, A Visit to Berlin 2009, Today Art Museum, Beijing, China
- 2010 Dieter Jung, Flying Colors – Moments of Seeing OCT Art & Design Gallery, Shenzhen, China
- 2011 Today Art Museum, Beijing; Dieter Jung, Space-Light-Colour, LinLin Gallery, Beijing, China

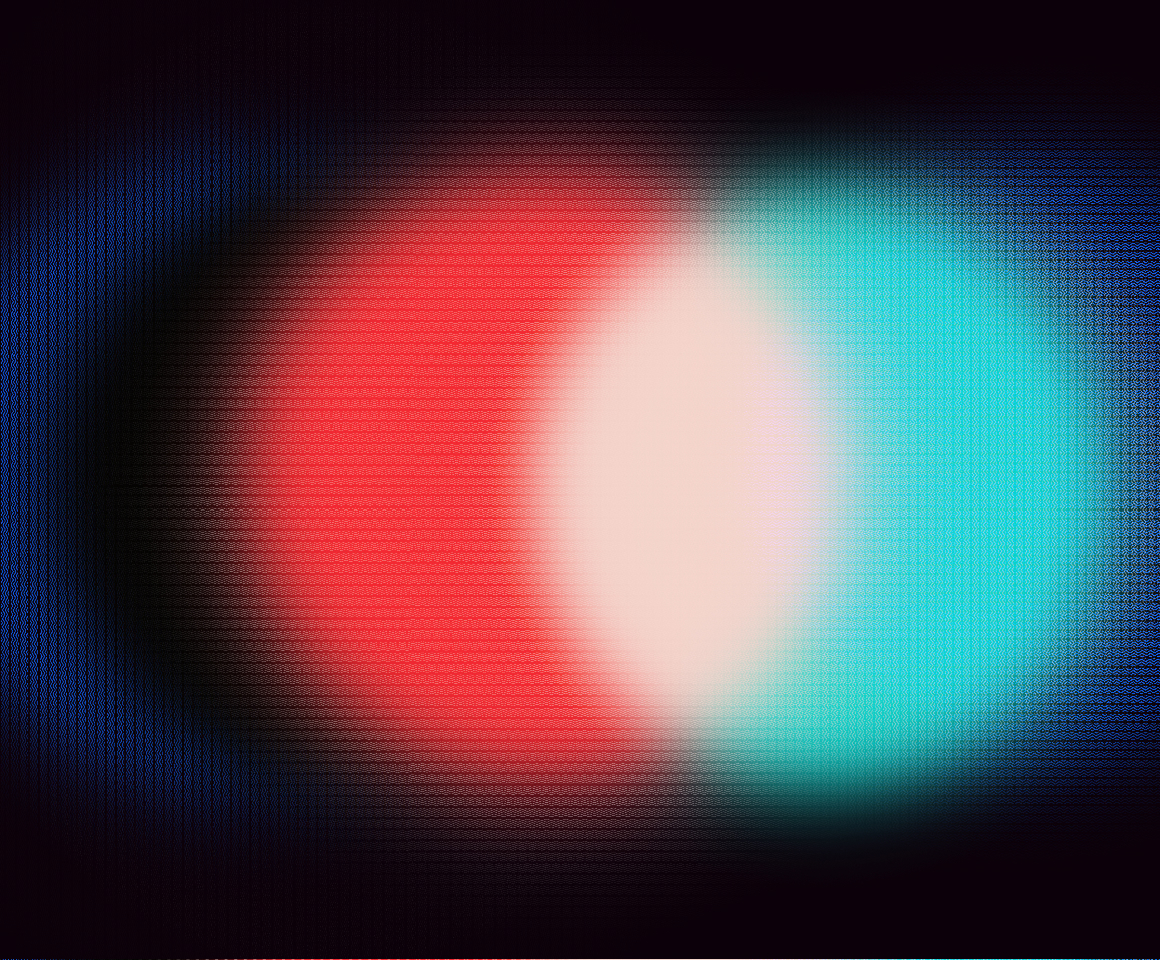
Dieter Jung, Eclipse-VIII, 2009, Inkjet/Archival Paper

== Group exhibitions ==
- 1968: Nouvelle École de Berlin, Galerie Motte, Geneva / Milan / Paris
- 1969: New York Studio School, New York
- 1971: Kunsthalle, Baden-Baden, Germany
- 1976: Musée National de Monaco, Monte Carlo, Monaco
- 1977: Berlin Now, Contemporary Art
- 1977: Denise René Gallery, New York; New York Avant Garde Festival, World Trade Center, New York
- 1979: Museum of Holography, New York; Holographie, Neuer Berliner Kunstverein, Berlin, Germany
- 1981: Museum of Natural History, Beijing, China
- 1983: Light Dimensions, Science Museum, London, England; Ars Electronica, Linz, Austria
- 1985: East-West Encounter, National Center for The Performing Arts, Bombay, India; National Geographic Society's Explorers Hall, Washington, USA; Mehr Licht, Kunsthalle Hamburg, Hamburg, Germany; A Imagem Holografica, Calouste Gulbenkian Foundation, Lisbon, Portugal
- 1986: Museum Charlottenborg, Copenhagen, Denmark; LUMIÈRES –Perception/ Projection, Centre d´Art Contemporaine de Montréal, Quebec, Canada; Holomedia, Städt. Galerie im Prinz-Max-Palais, Karlsruhe, Germany; Lichtjahre, Künstlerhaus Wien, Vienna, Austria; Holography, Institut for Telecommunication, Beijing, China; Internationale Poesifestival, Oslo Konzerthus, Oslo, Norway
- 1987: Ologrammi, Museo de Fotographia, Florence, Italy; Light Dreams, Kalamazoo Institute of Arts, Michigan, USA; Morris Museum, Morristown, New Jersey, USA; National Museum of Science, Ottawa and Montreal, Canada
- 1988: LightsOrot, Yeshiva University Museum, New York; Museum of Science, Los Angeles
- 1990: Fotografie, Wissenschaft und neue Technologien, Kunstmuseum Düsseldorf, Germany
- 1992: Moving Image, Museum Fundació Joan Miró, Barcelona, Spain
- 1993: Virtual-Real Image, The World of Holography ´93, Daimaru Museum, Tokyo, Japan; Das Licht-Die Musik-Der Raum, with Otto Piene, Heinz Mack, Günther Uecker, Ferdinand Kriwet, music by Karlheinz Stockhausen, Landtag Nordrhein-Westfalen, Düsseldorf, Germany; MIT Museum, Cambridge, Massachusetts, US; 81996 Holographic Network, Akademie der Künste Berlin and Bauhaus Archiv Berlin, Germany
- 1997: UNESCO, Paris, France
- 1999: Natura della luce, Galleria d'Arte Contemporaneo, Venice, Italy; Farblicht, Städtische Galerie Würzburg and Kunstmuseum Heidenheim, Germany; Malerei, Galerie Neher, Essen, Germany; Lumia, International Lyskunst, Charlottenborg Museum, Copenhagen, Denmark; Kangastus Mirage, Rauman Taidemuseo, 9.10-5.12.1999, Finland
- 2000: Manege, St. Petersburg, Russia; Kangastus Mirage, Verutitalli-Salon kaupungin taidemuseo, 14.1-12.3.2000; Kemin taidemuseo, 16.6.-20.8.2000; Kajaanin teidemuseo, 3.9-29.10.2000, Finland; Machines Times, V2, Rotterdam, Netherlands
- 2001: SkyArt Conference, Delphi and Ikaria, Greece; College of Fine Arts, Paddington, Sydney, Australia
- 2005: Two Asias-Two Europes, Doland Museum of Modern Art, Shanghai, China; Enseigner /Produire: Exposition Enquête, Centre Georges Pompidou, Paris, France
- 2006: Museum of Contemporary Art /ZKM, Karlsruhe, Germany; Entry Gate, Museum of Contemporary Art, Shanghai, China; Motion in a Square, Museum Ritter, Waldenbuch, Germany
- 2007: Remote Control, Museum of Contemporary Art Shanghai, China
- 2008: Museo de Arte Moderno, Mérida, Venezuela
- 2009: Museo Alejandro von Humboldt, Havana, Cuba; Animamix, Today Art Museum, Beijing, China
- 2010: Animamix, Guangdong Art Museum, Guangzhou, China; Luminous Windows, MIT Museum, Cambridge, MA, USA; The Year We Make Contact, Media Scape, HDLU Croatian Association of Artists, Zagreb, Croatia
- 2011: Future Pass, 54th Biennale di Venezia, Abbazia di San Gregorio, Venice, Italy
- 2015: Interact: Deconstructing Spectatorship: East Wing Biennial, The Courtauld Institute of Art, London, England (with a. o. Liu Bolin, Sebastian Brajkovic, Matthew Buckingham, Pablo Delgado, Petra Feriancová, Felix Gonzalez-Torres, Donald Martiny, Julie Mehretu, Katie Paterson, Bridget Riley, Regina Silveira, Marc Quinn, Shezad Dawood)

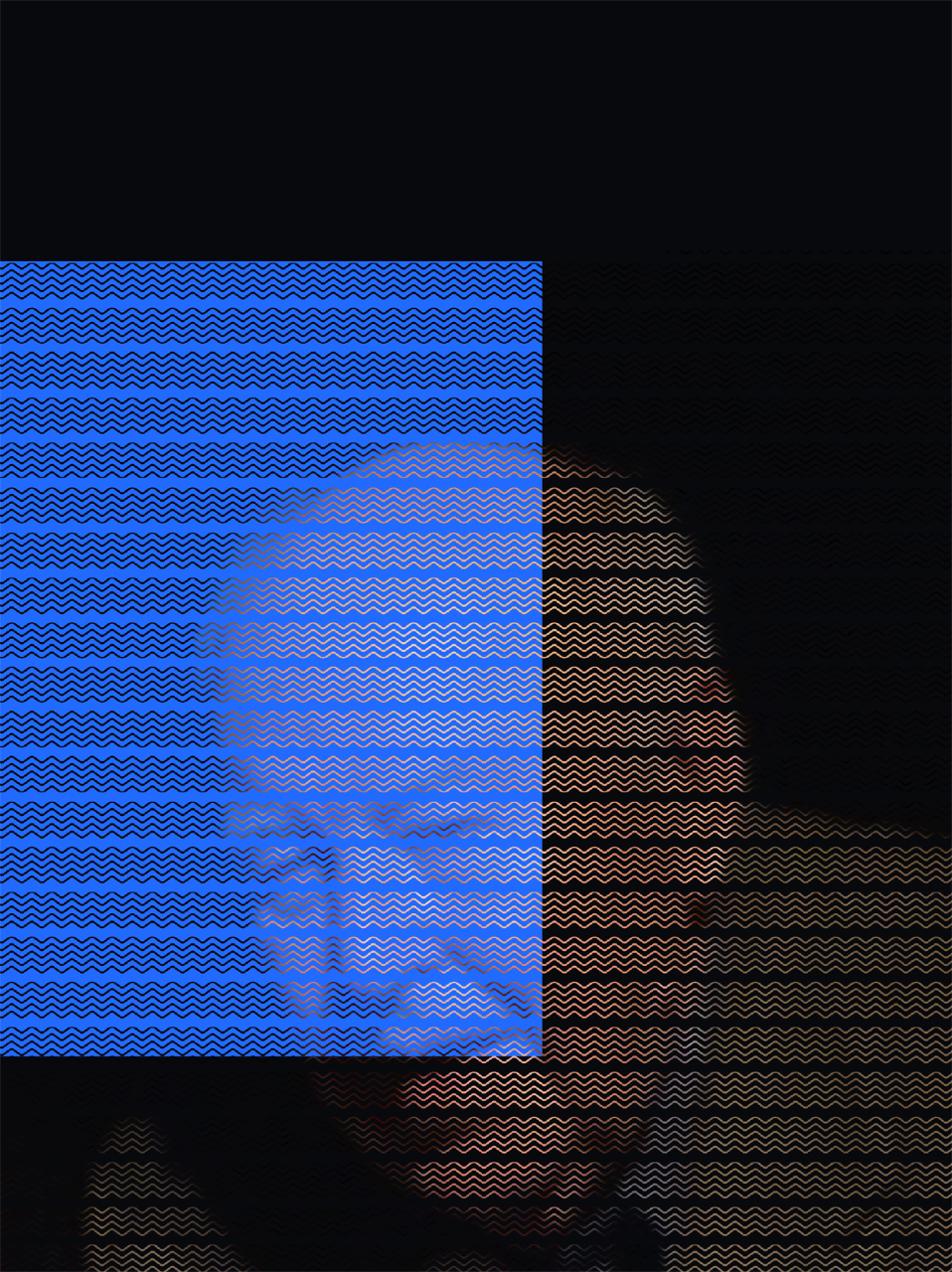
Dieter Jung, Yuri Denisyuk, 2005, Inkjet/Archival Paper

== Publications ==
=== By Dieter Jung ===
Books

Editor, 2003 Holographic Network, by Dieter Jung with essays by Elizabeth Goldring, Otto Piene, Frank Popper, Roger Malina, Paul Earls, Eberhard Roters, Christian Schneegass and Siegfried Zielinski, Verlag Rasch Bramsche 2003. ISBN 3-89946-004-9

Articles

“Transcript“ in Artists Today, Marg Publications, Bombay 1987; “Holographic Space“ in Leonardo (journal), vol. 22, no 3/4,1989; Jung / Pepper “Creative Holography: Its Development in the Academy of Media Arts Cologne“ in SPIE Proceedings, vol. 1600,1991; “Bildräume der Holographie“ in Kultur und Technik im 21. Jahrhundert, edited by G. Kaiser, Frankfurt and New York 1993; “L´Espace Holographique“ in La science et la métamorphose des arts, Nouvelle Encyclopédie Diderot, Paris 1994; “Luz na Arte / Arte da Luz“ in exhibition catalogue, Goethe-Institut Salvador, Brazil1995; “Ein Kubikmeter Licht“ in Otto Piene, Kunst die fliegt, edited by H. Stachelhaus, DuMont Schauberg Köln 1998; “Holes in Sky“ in Sky Art, edited by Kracke/Knott, Center for Advanced Visual Studies and MIT, Cambridge 2005. “As I see it - The absence of darkness”, Advances in Display Holography, edited by Hans Bjelkhagen, River Valley Press, England 2006. Otto Piene, by Ante Glibota, Delight Edition, 2011. ISBN 978-988-19-5322-3. The Transfer of Technology, Interview in ArtToday, Vol.12, Beijing 2009. The Perceptual Holograms of Dieter Jung, by Jeno Lu in Zhai Bao Rong Contemporary Art (Vol.6), Singapore/Beijing 2010.

=== On Dieter Jung ===
Books

Experiment Design by Igildo Biesele, Zürich 1986; Holographie by Peter Zec, DuMont Köln 1987; Dieter Jung – Hologrammes, Dessins, Peintures by Ante Glibota, Paris Art Center, Paris 1989; Dieter Jung – Bilder, Zeichnungen, Hologramme, Köln 1991; Art in the electronic Age by Frank Popper, London and Paris1993; Dieter Jung-Anders als man denkt by Marianne Lauter, Würzburg 2003; Dieter Jung -The Garden of Light by Fang-Wei Chang, Taipei 2005. Dieter Jung- The Passion of Light, by Chen Qibin, Shanghai 2006. Two Asias-Two Europes, by Gu Zhenqing, Timezone 8, Shanghai; LightArt from Artificial Light by Peter Weibel/Jansen, ZKM Publications: Entry Gate. Chinese Aesthetics of Heterogeneity by Samuel Kung, MoCA Shanghai; Dieter Jung- The Passion of Light, by Chen Qibin, Zendai Museum of Modern Art Shanghai; Motion in Square, by Museum Ritter/ Gerda Ridler, Heidelberg. Remote/Control by Samuel Kung, Museum of Contemporary Art, Shanghai 2007; Dieter Jung-Looking Foreword by S. Zhao, Beijing 2007. Dieter Jung – Phases/Faces by Oroom Gallery, Seoul 2008; Dieter Jung, Invisible/Visible by Dai Dongmei / Chen Aier, Beijing 2008; Dieter Jung, Flying Colors-Moments of Seeing, OCT Gallery, Shenzhen 2010. The Perceptual Holograms of Dieter Jung, by Jeno Lu in Zhai Bao Rong Contemporary Art (Vol.6), Beijing 2010.

== Works in public collections ==
- Berlinische Galerie, Berlin
- Kunsthalle Bremen
- Karl-Ernst-Osthaus-Museum, Hagen
- Zentrum für Kunst und Medientechnologie, Karlsruhe
- Hara Museum of Contemporary Art, Tokyo
- Musée national des beaux-arts du Québec, Quebec City
- Brooklyn Museum of Art, New York
- Metropolitan Museum of Art, New York
- MIT Museum, Cambridge, Massachusetts
- Yellow Stone Art Center, Montana
- Museum im Kulturspeicher, Würzburg
- Museu de Arte de São Paulo
- Museu de Arte Moderna, Rio de Janeiro
- Kunsthalle Hamburg
- Museo Nacional de Bellas Artes, Havana
- Taipei Fine Arts Museum
- Museum of Fine Arts, Kaohsiung
- Treptowers, Berlin
- Museum of Contemporary Art, Shanghai
- Zendai Museum of Modern Art, Shanghai
- Beijing Imperial City Art Museum, Beijing
- Today Art Museum, Beijing
- European Patent Office, Munich and The Hague
