= Liu Bolin =

Chinese contemporary artist (born 1973)

Liu Bolin 刘勃麟
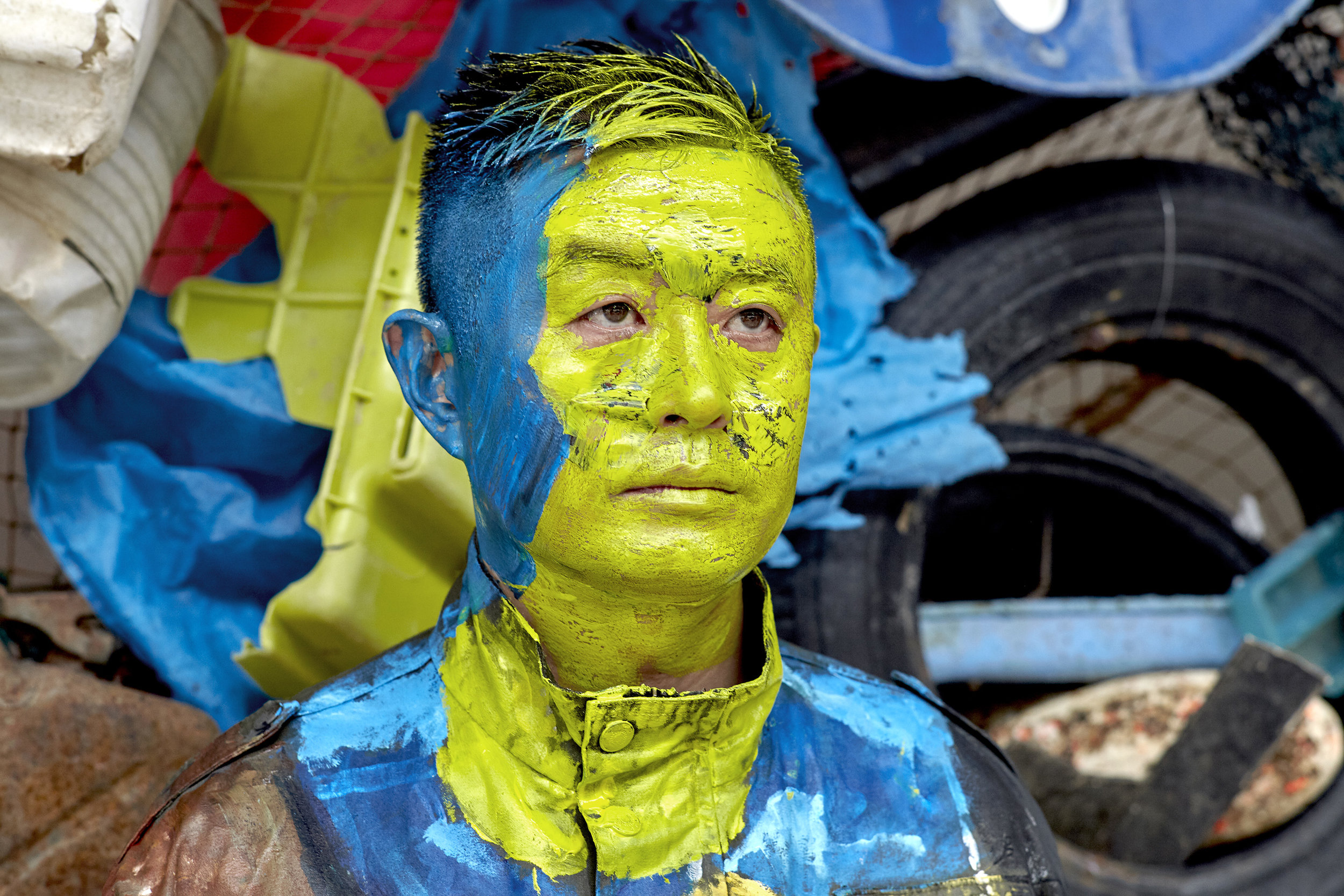
- Liu Bolin
- Born: 7 January 1973 (age 53); Shandong, China
- Notable work: Hiding in the City

Liu Bolin (simplified Chinese: 刘勃麟; traditional Chinese: 劉勃麟; pinyin: Liú Bólín; born 7 January 1973) is a Chinese contemporary artist who specialises in self-portraits where he is disguised to match his surroundings. He earned his Bachelor of Fine Arts from the Shandong College of Arts in 1995 and his Master of Fine Arts from the Central Academy of Fine Arts in Beijing in 2001. His work has been exhibited in museums around the world. Also known as "the invisible man", Liu's most popular works are from his "Hiding in the City" series, photographic works that began as performance art in 2005 in response to the artists' village in which he worked in Beijing being demolished in preparation for the 2008 Beijing Olympics.

Since his first solo shows in Beijing in 1998, Liu's work has received international recognition. Among other international venues, his distinctive photographs and sculptures have been shown at the major contemporary photography festival Les Rencontres d'Arles and he had solo shows at Dashanzi Art Zone in Beijing (2007), Galerie Bertin-Toublanc in Paris (2007), Klein Sun Gallery in New York (2008), Galerie Paris-Beijing in Paris and Brussels (2013), Boxart Gallery in Verona (2008), Forma Foundation for Photography in Milan (2010), and the H. C. Andersen Museum in Rome (2012).

== Personal life ==
Liu belongs to the generation that came of age in the early 1990s, when China emerged from the rubble of the Cultural Revolution and was beginning to enjoy rapid economic growth and relative political stability. He currently lives and works in Beijing, China.

== Series ==
=== Hiding in the City ===
Liu was moved to create his "Hiding in the City" series after the destruction of the Beijing artists' village Suo Jia Cun in November 2005. At the time of the destruction, Liu had been working in Suo Jia Cun, previously given the title of Asia's largest congregation of artists. Prompted by his emotional response to the demolition of this site, Liu decided to use his art as a means of silent protest, calling attention to the lack of protection Chinese artists had received from their own government. Through the use of his own body in his practice of painting himself into various settings in Beijing, Liu created a space for Chinese artists, preserving their social status and highlighting their often troubled relationship with their physical surroundings.

In his work, Liu has always given special attention to the various social problems that accompany China's rapid economic development, making social politics the crux of his pictorial commentaries. In "Hiding in the City", Liu made one of his particular focuses slogans as an educational tool used within Communist societies, pointing out that many people would become used to the slogans over time and cease to pay conscious attention to the messages' effects on the public's thinking. By painting his body into some such slogans, Liu forces the viewer to acknowledge the messages and, in the process, to reconsider the circumstances of one's own life.

The "Hiding in the City" series has inspired similar subsequent series by Liu Bolin. In particular, "Shadow" draws on the same concept of the helplessness of the individual; however, instead of taking the individual in the face of society as its focal point, "Shadow" explores the relationship of the individual to its natural environment. Rather than painting himself into the background of various man-made structures, as he did in "Hiding in the City", here Liu lay on surfaces during periods of rain, keeping the space directly below his body dry. The flat human figure created by his presence always quickly disappeared when Liu moved away, demonstrating the extent to which humans are helpless before their environment. The British artist Andrew Goldsworthy has also used the same technique, albeit in a natural environment.

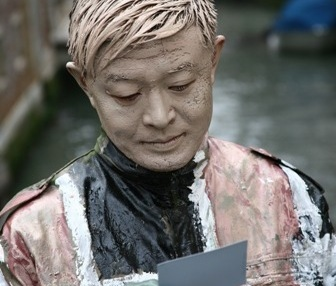
Liu Bolin during a "Hiding in Italy" performance

Liu Bolin followed up his Beijing series of "Hiding in the City" with two derivative series of performances captured in Venice, Milan, Rome, Pompeii, Verona and New York City. Following the method of painting himself into the cityscapes, Liu chose Italy for its significance within the Western art tradition and New York City for the potency of the underlying conflicts between humans and the objects they create. The first derivative series, on going since 2008, was titled "Hiding in Italy" and was collected into the solo exhibition "Liu Bolin. A Secret Tour", at H. C. Andersen Museum in Rome, curated by Raffaele Gavarro in 2012. In service to this project, Liu painted himself into such socially-loaded backgrounds as Wall Street and the Tiles for America 9/11 memorial.

In June 2011, Liu created his Hiding in New York series, in which he incorporated iconic New York sites into his work.

In February 2012, a collaborative project was announced between Liu Bolin and designers Gaultier, Valentino, Lanvin and Missoni that was featured in the March 2012 issue of Harper's Bazaar magazine. Following the success of his series of works camouflaging prominent people into backgrounds, he collaborated with French artist JR. He was also featured as a prominent artist in a Newsweek profile titled Eli Klein on Riding the Wave of China's Contemporary Art Scene.

On the South Pier, at the Port of Catania, is recovered aground the first boat that in 2013 carried migrants from Africa to the coasts of Catania. Among them, six children Egyptians, exhausted for the trip on that vessel, were tragically drowned trying to reach the seashore, a few meters far from the Lido Beach Green (Lido Verde). The artist chose to merge his body with the wreck and the history of which he is a silent witness for his first shot of the MIGRANTS project, dated 2015. The scenario of the tragedy evoked by the first work, the Lido Verde, provides the second background to the Liu Bolin's photographic project. "Being immigrants lying on the sand," says the artist, "for someone they may seem dead; instead my intent is to describe their arrival and the start of their future."

== Exhibition history ==
=== Solo exhibitions ===
- 2018: "Le théâtre des apparences", Musée de l'Élysée, Switzerland.
- 2014: "Liu Bolin: Fade in Italy," Boxart, Verona, Italy
- 2013: Liu Bolin, Galerie Paris-Beijing, Paris, France
- 2012: "Liu Bolin. A Secret Tour", Museo H.C. Andersen, Rome, Italy
- 2012: "Liu Bolin: Hide in the City," Multimedia Art Museum Moscow
- 2011: Hiding in the City, Galerie Paris-Beijing, Beijing, China
- 2011: The Invisible Man, Klein Sun Gallery, New York, NY
- 2011: The Invisible Man, Vänermuseet, Lidköping, Sweden
- 2011: The Invisible Man, Fotografiska Stockholm, Sweden
- 2011: "Hiding in Italy," Forma Centro Internazionale Di Fotografia, Milano, Italy
- 2010: Hiding in the City, Museo de Bellas Artes, Caracas, Venezuela
- 2010: Sunshine International Art Museum, Songzhuang, Beijing, China
- 2010: On Fire, Klein Sun Gallery, New York, NY
- 2008: "Hide and Seek," Boxart, Verona, Italy
- 2008: China Report 2007, Klein Sun Gallery, New York, NY
- 2007: Sculpture, Dashanzi Art Zone, Beijing, China
- 2007: Distortion, Dashanzi Art Zone, Beijing, China
- 1998: Haiyang Works Exhibition, Yantai, China

=== Group exhibitions ===
- 2015: Interact: Deconstructing Spectatorship: East Wing Biennial, The Courtauld Institute of Art, London, England (with a. o. Sebastian Brajkovic, Matthew Buckingham, Pablo Delgado, Petra Feriancová, Felix Gonzalez-Torres, Dieter Jung, Donald Martiny, Julie Mehretu, Katie Paterson, Bridget Riley, Regina Silveira, Marc Quinn, Shezad Dawood)
- 2011: Fotográfica Biennale, Museo de Fotografía, Bogotá, Colombia
- 2011: Black and White, Zero Field Art Center, Beijing, China
- 2010: The Right to Protest, Museum on the Seam, Jerusalem, Israel
- 2010: Reflection of Minds. Shanghai MoCA, Shanghai, China
- 2010: Passing China, Sanatorium, Istanbul, Turkey
- 2010: HomeLessHome, Museum on the Seam, Jerusalem, Israel
- 2010: Armed & Dangerous: Art of the Arsenal, Berkshire Museum, Pittsfield, MA
- 2009-10: Animamix Biennial, Shanghai MoCA, Shanghai, China; Today Art Museum, Beijing, China; Guangdong Museum of Art, Guangzhou, China
- 2009: Shore – Contemporary Academy Sculpture Exhibition, Moon River Art Museum, Beijing, China
- 2009: Blank – Making China, Zhongjian Art Museum, Beijing, China
- 2009: International Contemporary Art Invitational Exhibition, Seoul Art Museum, Seoul, Korea
- 2009: Erotic – Contemporary Art Invitational Exhibition, Dadi Rui City Exhibition Center, Jinan, China
- 2009: The Big World: Recent Art from China, Chicago Cultural Center, Chicago, USA
- 2009: Passing By China, Klein Sun Gallery, New York, NY
- 2009: Camouflage, La Casa Encendida, Madrid, Spain
- 2008: Mixed Maze – Group Photography Exhibition, Red Mansion Foundation, London, UK
- 2008: New Middle Kingdom, Royal Liver Building, Liverpool, UK
- 2008: Live, Galerie Adler, Paris, France
- 2008: Force-Form, International Contemporary Art Exhibition, Bridge Art Center, Beijing, China
- 2008: Sunshine International Art Museum, Songzhuang, Beijing, China
- 2007: Olympic Landscape Sculpture Exhibition, Beijing, China
- 2007: Les Rencontres d'Arles, Arles, France
- 2007: Made in China - Chinese Contemporary Art, Shanghai Duolun Museum of Modern Art, Shanghai, China
- 2007: Union - Exhibition of Chinese and Chile Artists, No. 1 China Art Base, Beijing, China
- 2007: Union in June, Chinese Performance Art Exhibition, Songzhuang, Beijing, China
- 2007: Resettling - Suo Jia Village Modern Art Exhibition, Beijing International Arts Camp II Ka Tsuen, Beijing, China
- 2007: The First 'Breathing' - Shandong Modern Art Exhibition, Shandong Museum, Shandong, China
- 2006: Songzhuang Art Festival, Songzhuang Art Zone, Beijing, China
- 2006: Qingzhou International Contemporary Art Exhibition, Qingzhou Museum, Shandong, China
- 2006: Third Contemporary Art Exhibition, Sunshine International Museum, Beijing, China
- 2006: Contemporary Art Exhibition of Dismantle, Xiyuantianlu Business Hotel, Beijing, China
- 2005: Beijing Calligraphy Exhibition Maside Art Center, Beijing, China
- 2005: Lead Times, Chang Chau Chinese Contemporary Sculpture Exhibition, Tianjin Harbor Plaza, Tianjin, China
- 2005: Di-Di-Dismantle, Beijing International Arts Camp II Ka Tsuen, Beijing, China
- 2005: Considerable, West Lake International Sculpture Exhibition, Hangzhou Fine Art Museum, Hangzhou, China
- 2001: "The Second Invitational Sculpture Exhibition of Contemporary Young Sculptors," Hangzhou Fine Art Museum, Hangzhou, China
- 2001: Works Exhibition The First China Sculpture Competition, China
- 2000: The Second Metals Work Exhibition, Central Academy of Fine Arts, Beijing, China

=== Other work ===
To celebrate US President Barack Obama's visit to China in 2009, he made an effigy of Obama in his honor.

In January 2013, Liu created the artwork for New Jersey hard rock band Bon Jovi's 2013 album What About Now.

== Publications ==
- Liu Bolin, A Secret Tour, with texts by Matilde Amaturo, Raffaele Gavarro, Maretti Editore, 2012. ISBN 9788889477885
- Liu Bolin, Thircuir Books, 2012. ISBN 978-988-19924-5-1
- Liu Bolin, Hiding in Italy, with texts by Beatrice Benedetti and Nicola Ricciardi, Shin Productions, Brescia, 2010. ISBN 9788889477885
- Liu, Bolin; Benedetti, Beatrice; Tarocco, Francesca (2008). Liu Bolin : Hide and Seek (PDF). Verona: Boxart. OCLC 800208108. Archived from the original (PDF) on 2016-10-11.
