= Australian Holographics =

Laboratory

Australian Holographics Pty Ltd.
- Founded: 1989; 36 years ago in Adelaide, Australia
- Founder: David Brotherton-Ratcliffe
- Defunct: 1998
- Headquarters: Adelaide
- Key people: Simon Edhouse

Australian Holographics was a laboratory based in Adelaide, South Australia. It was established in 1989; the laboratory was used to try to produce high-quality large format holograms. After two years of development, the company began commercial operations in 1991. The laboratory eventually shut down in 1998. The lab was situated on 80 acres (320,000 m^{2}) of rural farmland 25 miles (40 km) from Adelaide.

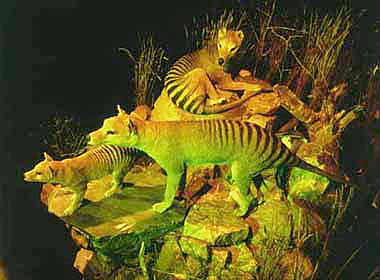
A thylacines hologram by Australian Holographics

== Facilities ==
The lab's facilities included a 5×6 meters vibration isolation table in a studio with air-lock loading doors. The main laser was a continuous wave, 6 W argon laser built by Coherent Scientific. The company also used a 3-joule ruby pulse laser, built in collaboration with Professor Jesper Munch of the School of Chemistry and Physics at the University of Adelaide.

The company specialized in the production of large white-light-viewable rainbow holograms, a type of holography originally invented in 1968 by Stephen Benton of MIT. In 1992, Australian Holographics produced a 2×1 metre rainbow transmission hologram of a Mitsubishi station wagon car, which was shown at the Holographics International '92 conference in London.

For the AH project, they built a large climate-controlled studio that incorporated a 6×5 metre, 25-ton optical table. A sand-filled cavity steel construction was used for the table. The suspension system was constructed around nine Firestone air bags connected to a standard pneumatic set-up. Overhead towers were designed to carry large transfer mirrors at heights of over three meters above the table. These towers were constructed from hollow steel tubes filled with sand.

== History ==
Australian Holographics Pty Ltd. was incorporated in Adelaide, South Australia, in 1989 by David Brotherton Ratcliffe. At the time, Ratcliffe was a Research Fellow in Physics in the School of Physical Sciences, at Flinders University. The senior holographers working with Ratcliffe were initially Geoffrey Fox, and subsequently Mark Trinne.

In 1992, Ratcliffe formed GEOLA Labs in Vilnius, Lithuania, to concentrate on the manufacture of pulsed neodymium YLF lasers. In May 1992, Simon Edhouse joined Australian Holographics as Marketing Manager and became the General Manager later that year. Then the company focused on international science museums. It sold large holograms to museums in Hong Kong, Singapore, Taipei and Japan. In 1993, Sunkung Corporation of South Korea commissioned Australian Holographics to produce an exhibition of ten large format holograms for Expo '93. In October 1993, Ratcliffe relocated to Europe and handed operational control to Simon Edhouse and his company, Multi Cellular Media Pty. Ltd. Simon Edhouse managed the marketing and overall operations until the Australian facility closed in 1998.

In 1994, Australian Holographics produced a series of holographic billboards for the Singaporean military to promote the 'NS Men' (National Service Men) campaign, unveiled by the Singapore Minister for Defence. The holograms were rainbow transmissions and enclosed in a compact viewing enclosure. Also in 1994, Multi Cellular Media Pty. Ltd., trading as Australian Holographics, signed a joint venture agreement with the South Australian Museum, giving the company access to the museum's vast collection of exhibits.

=== Holographic projects ===
One of the first projects undertaken by the venture was the production of a 1.6×1.1 metre rainbow transmission hologram of a family of thylacines. The holographic thylacines, shown standing on a rocky outcrop in a field of dry grass, portray the now-extinct thylacines as a family group, with the small thylacine pup protruding 50 cm in front of the holographic image-plane. The finished hologram debuted at the SA Museum as part of the Inaugural Innovate SA festival in September 1995.

The company also produced a 1.5×1.1 metre hologram of a Tyrannosaurus rex skull from the SA Museum's collection. In 1995, a large series of holograms were produced of satellites and space vehicles. There is also a 2.1×1.1 metre rainbow transmission hologram of the MIR Space Station. The model of the Earth in this hologram was custom-made by Adelaide artist John Haratsis.

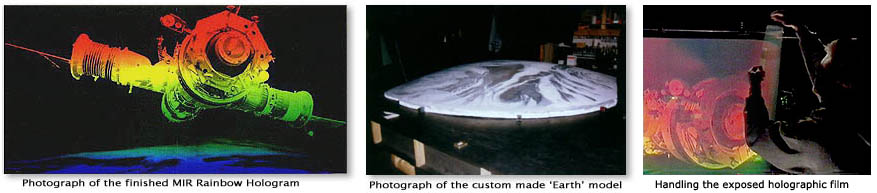

== Artists working with Australian Holographics ==
In 1992, Professor Ju Yong Lee, a lecturer at the Korea National University of Arts, was given a grant by the company to undertake a period as artist-in-residence. In 1993, he commissioned Australian Holographics to produce a series of ten large format holograms, designed by Lee, that were displayed at the Korean Expo in Seoul.

In 1995, holographic artist Paula Dawson was also awarded an artist in residence grant by the company to produce a 30×40 cm reflection hologram for the Shrine of the Sacred Heart for St. Brigid's Church in Sydney. The hologram depicted a four-metre spherical geodesic dome made from reinforced plaster and constructed in the lab. It also contained hundreds of frangipani flowers, in dozens of egg cartons, flown from Sydney on the day of the shoot. The hologram was partly funded by the Catholic Church and the Australian Artist Creative Fellowship from the Australia Council.
