= Pacific Coast Highway =

Pacific Coast Highway may refer to:

== Roads ==
- Pacific Coast Highway or PCH, segments of California State Route 1
- Pacific Coast Highway, parts of State Highway 2 (New Zealand) and all of State Highway 25 (New Zealand) and State Highway 35 (New Zealand).
- Pacific Coast Scenic Byway, segments of U.S. Route 101:
  - U.S. Route 101 in Oregon
  - U.S. Route 101 in Washington

== Public transportation ==
- Pacific Coast Highway station (A Line), a Los Angeles Metro Rail station in Long Beach, California
- Pacific Coast Highway station (J Line), a Los Angeles Metro Busway station in Carson, California

== Music ==
- "Pacific Coast Highway", a song by The Mamas & the Papas from People Like Us, 1971
- Pacific Coast Highway, the first solo album by Christopher Franke
- "Pacific Coast Highway" (song), by Hole
- "Pacific Coast Highway", a song by Sonic Youth from Sister
- "Pacific Coast Highway", a song by Kavinsky from the EP Nightcall
- "Pacific Coast Highway", a song by The Beach Boys from That's Why God Made the Radio
- "Pacific Coast Highway", a song by The Hip Abduction and Trevor Hall
- "Pacific Coast Highway", a song by The Travoltas from Teenbeat

== Games ==
- Pacific Coast Highway (video game), a Frogger clone video game for Atari 8-bit computers

== See also ==
- Coast Highway
- Pacific Highway (disambiguation)
- PCH (disambiguation)
