= Dieter Jung =

Dieter Jung may refer to:

- Dieter Jung (fencer)
- Dieter Jung (artist)
