= HPU =

HPU may refer to:

== Universities ==
- Hawaii Pacific University, in Honolulu, Hawaii, US
- High Point University, in High Point, North Carolina, US
- Himachal Pradesh University, in Shimla, Himachal Pradesh, India
- Howard Payne University, in Brownwood, Texas, US
- Henan Polytechnic University, in Jiaozuo, Henan, China

== Computing ==
- Hogel processing unit, a parallel computation device for a holographic light-field display
- Holographic processing unit, a custom coprocessor by Microsoft

== Other uses ==
- Hapur Junction railway station (station code), in India
- Team Hitec Products, a professional cycling team
- Home plate umpire in baseball
