= Coast Highway =

Highway segment/road name

Coast Highway may refer to certain segments of the following highways:

- California State Route 1
- Big Sur Coast Highway
- Old Coast Road (Big Sur)
- San Diego County Route S21
- U.S. Route 101
  - U.S. Route 101 in California
  - U.S. Route 101 in Oregon
  - U.S. Route 101 in Washington

== See also ==
- Coast Highway station, Oceanside, California
- Pacific Coast Highway (disambiguation)
- Pacific Highway (disambiguation)
