= PCH =

PCH may refer to:

== Places ==
- Pacific Coast Highway (California), segments of California State Route 1
- Palacios Airport (IATA code PCH) in Gracias a Dios Department, Honduras
- Parchim (district) (vehicle registration code: PCH), a former district in Germany
- Portcullis House, a parliamentary building in London

== Organizations ==
- Packet Clearing House, the intergovernmental treaty organization responsible for critical communications infrastructure
- PCH International, an Irish custom design manufacturing company
- Phoenix Children's Hospital, Phoenix, Arizona
- Perth Children's Hospital, Perth, Australia
- Publishers Clearing House, an American bulk mail periodical, mass media, and sweepstakes company
- Haitian Communist Party, commonly referred to by its French abbreviation PCH, from Parti communiste haïtien

== Science and technology ==
- .pch, a file extension for precompiled headers
- Paroxysmal cold hemoglobinuria, a human disease characterized by the sudden presence of hemoglobin in the urine
- Platform Controller Hub, an Intel chipset component
- Pontocerebellar hypoplasia, a group of neurodegenerative disorders
- Phase-coherent holography, a type of holography
- Pulmonary capillary hemangiomatosis, a human disease affecting the blood vessels of the lungs
- A US Navy hull classification symbol: Patrol craft hydrofoil (PCH)

== Music ==
- "PCH", a song by Sublime with Rome from Yours Truly
- "PCH", a song by Canadian rock band Theory of a Deadman from Wake Up Call (2017)
- "PCH", a song by Tokyo Police Club from the EP Melon Collie and the Infinite Radness: Part One
- ”PCH”, a song by Jaden Smith and Willow Smith from the mix tape CTV2
- "PCH", a song by ZZ Top from Antenna (1994)

== Other uses ==
- PCH Games (formerly Candystand.com), a casual game portal owned by Publishers Clearing House
- Pacific Coast Hellway, a podcast from Los Angeles, US
