= Spatial Imaging Group =

No longer active as of Spring 2004, the Spatial Imaging Group at the MIT Media Lab developed new technology and interfaces for high-quality 3D displays.

The lab's research included: designing new hologram formats and optical printers; electro-holographic displays and methods for computing holograms; spatial interaction and information design; rapid rendering for spatial displays; and viewer-tracked autostereoscopic displays.
