= Rainbow hologram =

Type of hologram

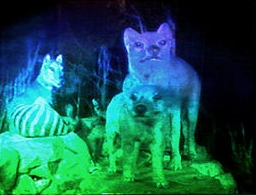
A rainbow hologram

The rainbow hologram (also known as Benton hologram) is a type of hologram that was invented in 1968 by Dr. Stephen A. Benton at Polaroid Corporation (later MIT). Rainbow holograms are designed to be viewed under white light illumination, rather than the laser light which was required before this. The rainbow holography recording process uses a horizontal slit to eliminate vertical parallax in the output image, greatly reducing spectral blur while preserving three-dimensionality for most observers. A viewer moving up or down in front of a rainbow hologram sees changing spectral colors rather than different vertical perspectives. Because perspective effects are reproduced along one axis only, the subject will appear variously stretched or squashed when the hologram is not viewed at an optimum distance; this distortion may go unnoticed when there is not much depth, but can be severe when the distance of the subject from the plane of the hologram is very substantial. Stereopsis and horizontal motion parallax, two relatively powerful cues to depth, are preserved.

The holograms found on credit cards are examples of rainbow holograms.

== How a rainbow hologram works ==
Figure 2. Optical arrangement for recording a rainbow hologram

Optical arrangement for viewing a rainbow hologram

Figure 2 shows an optical arrangement for making a rainbow hologram. The object is illuminated with laser light (not shown in the diagram), and an image is formed in the plane of the hologram plate used to record the hologram. A narrow horizontal slit is placed between the object and the lens. The hologram plate is also illuminated with a reference beam derived from the same laser (not shown in the diagram), and the interference pattern between object and reference beams is recorded.

The developed hologram is illuminated by a beam similar to the original reference beam. A re-constructed image of the original real image can be seen by an observer located to the right of the hologram. However, this image will appear as if it is being viewed through the re-constructed slit to the right of the plate. This means that only a small horizontal section of the image can be seen from any one location, though if the observer changes his/her viewing position, a different part of the object can be seen. If the hologram is illuminated with a laser beam of a different wavelength, the position of the reconstructed image will change. When the hologram is illuminated with a white light source directed from the left of the hologram plate, each colour re-constructs a different part of the image at a slightly different angle, so that the whole object is now seen, but with the colour varying in the vertical direction.

This hologram is a transmission hologram, where the hologram is illuminated on one side, and viewed from the other. Illumination and viewing can be done from the same side, if the hologram is mounted onto a reflective surface. Mass replication of such holograms can be done using an embossing process. These are used in a wide range of security applications such as credit cards, banknotes and quality merchandise.

== Reference sources ==
- Hariharan P, 2002, Basics of Holography, Cambridge University Press, ISBN 0-521-00200-1
