= Specular holography =

Specular holography is a technique for making three dimensional imagery by controlling the motion of specular glints on a two-dimensional surface. The image is made of many specularities and has the appearance of a 3D surface-stippling made of dots of light. Unlike conventional wavefront holograms, specular holograms do not depend on wave optics, photographic media, or lasers.

The principle of operation is purely one of geometric optics: A point light source produces a glint on a curved specular (shiny) surface; this glint appears to travel on the surface as the eye or light source moves. If that motion is projectively consistent with binocular disparity, the viewer will perceive — via stereopsis — the illusion that the glint occurs at a different depth than the surface that produces it. A specular hologram contains many such curved surfaces, all embedded in a host surface. Each produces a glint and the brain integrates the many 3D cues to perceive a 3D shape.

== Overview and history ==
Specular holography dates back to Hans Weil's attempts in the 1930s and thus has a longer history than conventional wavefront holography. Hans Weil filed a 1934 United Kingdom patent for a specular holography technique. The patent notes that scratches in a shiny surface produce glints that are only visible to certain viewpoints, depending on the scratch orientation; this anisotropy could be exploited to produce different images for different viewers. Weil appreciated that this might be used to produce 3D imagery, but it is not clear whether he knew how to do so, especially considering that modern techniques are heavily computational. The patent itself is limited to straight reflecting surfaces, which are not sufficient to produce 3D images.

In the 1970s, Gabriel Liebermann discovered that a scratch in the shape of a circular arc produces glints whose motion is approximately consistent with binocular disparity. His 1980 artwork World Brain is made of CNC-machined semi-circular arcs that produce a holographic effect. The phenomenon was independently discovered in the 1990s by William Beaty who popularized a method of making hand-drawn holograms using a compass (drafting). This has come to be known as scratch holography.

Beaty established a connection between scratch holography and conventional wavefront holography by pointing out that a circular arc approximates a scaled-up Benton rainbow hologram of a single point. This explains why scratch hologram images are subject to distracting distortions and collapse of the depth image outside of a very narrow field of view --- circular arcs are a fairly poor approximation to rainbow hologram fringes.

Beaty also pointed out that the rainbow hologram of a single point is a rectangular section of nested parabolics. If one were to view that geometry as a 3D reflective surface under collimated light, one would observe glint motion that is consistent with horizontal parallax. An everyday example is the parabolic Fresnel mirror used in many solar cookers. On cookers with fine Fresnel patterns, the holographic image of a depth-varying bar of light is readily apparent.

In 2008, Brand demonstrated a distortion-free form of specular holography. Instead of scratches, it employs very fine doubly curved mirrors or refractors, each computationally designed to produce distortion-free parallax over a wide field of view. Brand's method considers the bundle of light rays that must be delivered to the viewer as the viewer, light source, hologram, and holographic image move relative to each other. Through the law of reflection or Snell's law, this determines a set of differential or integral equations that relate the position and normal of each point on an optical surface. The equations specify a foliation of possible optical surfaces; the hologram is an intersection of this foliation and a thin shell that conforms to the host surface. Solar cookers represent one such foliation; scratch holograms do not, hence their distortion. One interesting property of the foliation approach is that it yields solutions for non-flat holographic surfaces and for unconventional viewing geometries. Brand has exhibited holograms with 3D scenes, animation, and ultra-wide field of view. A large collection can be seen at the Museum of Mathematics in New York.
