= Hogel =

Part of a light-field hologram

A hogel (a portmanteau of the words holographic and element) is a part of a light-field hologram, in particular a computer-generated one. It is considered a small holographic optical element or HOE and that its total effect to that of a standard hologram only that the resolution is lower and it involves a pixelated structure. An array of these elements form the complete image of a holographic recording, which is typically displayed in 3D free-viewing device.

In contrast to 2D pixels, hogels contain the direction and intensity of light rays from many perspectives and is in essence what is referred to as a micro-image in plenoptic imaging terms. Synthetic hogels are typically rendered through double-frustum, oblique slice & dice or polygonal/voxel ray-tracing/ray-casting. Research into efficient generation and compression of hogels may allow holographic displays to become more widely available.

An array of hogels can be used to reconstruct a light-field by emitting light through a microlens array or by reflective/transmissive photo-polymer holograms. The use of hogels eliminates the limitation on the number and size of pixels as well as the size of the lenses that constitute the lens array because the holograms are no longer physical entities. Recorded information in a hogel is through the object beam.

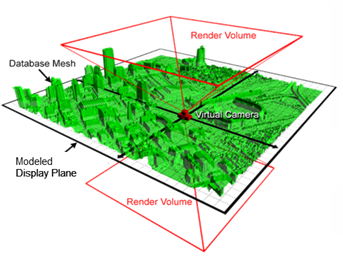
Hogel image plane with rendered hogel volume highlighted in red.

== Development ==
The term "hogel" was coined by Mark Lucente who first used it in his 1994 MIT Doctoral Thesis Dissertation.

More recent examples include a paper presented at the SMPTE 2nd Annual International Conference on Stereoscopic 3D for Media and Entertainment entitled "The First 20 Years of Holographic Video – and the Next 20", or in these recent book chapters: "Electronic Holography -- 20 Years of Interactive Spatial Imaging" in Handbook of Visual Display Technology , and "Computational Display Holography" in Holographic Imaging.
