= Signal beam =

Laser beam used to write holograms

A signal beam or object beam is one of at least two laser beams used to write holograms. The signal beam is the beam that carries the information to be stored in the hologram. In the case of a holographic picture, this beam is reflected off the object being recorded, into the media. In the case of holographic data storage, the beam has some kind information encoded into it (for instance, it can be sent through a transparency or a spatial light modulator).

The other beam necessary to write a hologram is the reference beam.
