= Atlantic Highway =

Atlantic Highway can refer to the following:

- Part of the A39 road in England
- Atlantic Highway (United States), an auto trail replaced by U.S. Route 1
- Atlantic Ocean Road, also the Atlantic Road, in Norway

== See also ==
- Pacific Highway (disambiguation)
