= Specularity =

Visual appearance of specular reflections

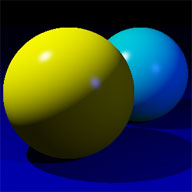
Specular highlights on a pair of spheres

Specularity is the visual appearance of specular reflections.

== In computer graphics ==
In computer graphics, it means the quantity used in three-dimensional (3D) rendering which represents the amount of reflectivity a surface has. It is a key component in determining the brightness of specular highlights, along with shininess to determine the size of the highlights.

It is frequently used in real-time computer graphics and ray tracing, where the mirror-like specular reflection of light from other surfaces is often ignored (due to the more intensive computations required to calculate it), and the specular reflection of light directly from point light sources is modeled as specular highlights.

=== Specular mapping ===
A materials system may allow specularity to vary across a surface, controlled by additional layers of texture maps.

=== The early misinterpretation of "Specularity" in computer graphics ===
Early shaders included a parameter called "Specularity". CG Artists, confused by this term discovered by experimentation that the manipulation of this parameter would cause a reflected highlight from a light source to appear and disappear and therefore misinterpreted "specularity" to mean "light highlights". In fact "Specular" is defined in optics as Optics. (of reflected light) directed, as from a smooth, polished surface (opposed to diffuse ). A specular surface is a highly smooth surface. When the surface is very smooth, the reflected highlight is easy to see. As the surface becomes rougher, the reflected highlights gets broader and dimmer. This is a more "diffused" reflection.

== In seismology ==
In the context of seismic migration, specularity is defined as the cosine of the angle made by the surface normal vector and the angle bisector of the angle defined by the directions of the incident and diffracted rays. For a purely specular seismic event the value of specularity should be equal to unity, as the angle between the surface normal vector and the angle bisector should be zero, according to Snell's Law. For a diffractive seismic event, the specularity can be sub-unitary. During the seismic migration, one can filter each seismic event according to the value of specularity, in order to enhance the contribution of diffractions in the seismic image. Alternatively, the events can be separated in different sub-images according to the value of specularity to produce a specularity gather.

== See also ==
- Specular holography
- Reflection mapping
