= Phase-coherent holography =

Phase-coherent holography is a type of holography, in which undiffracted beams are deflected phase-coherent. It can be used to reconstruct a three-dimensional image from optical field distribution
