= Reference beam =

A reference beam is a laser beam used to read and write holograms. It is one of two laser beams used to create a hologram. In order to read a hologram out, some aspects of the reference beam (namely its angle of incidence, beam profile and wavelength) must be reproduced exactly as when it was used to write the hologram. As a result, usually reference beams are Gaussian beams or spherical wave beams (beams that radiate from a single point) which are fairly easy to reproduce.

The other beam used to write a hologram is the signal beam or object beam.
