= Pacific Highway =

Pacific Highway may refer to:

- Pacific Highway (Australia) – Sydney, New South Wales to Brisbane, Queensland
- Pacific Highway (United States), the name of several highways in the United States
  - Pacific Coast Highway (California), segments of State Route 1
- British Columbia Highway 15, known locally as the Pacific Highway in Canada

== See also ==
- Pacific Motorway (Brisbane–Brunswick Heads) – Brunswick Heads, New South Wales to Brisbane, Queensland
- Pacific Motorway (Sydney–Newcastle) – Wahroonga, Sydney, New South Wales to Newcastle, New South Wales
- Pacific Coast Highway (disambiguation)
- Atlantic Highway (disambiguation)
