= Stephen Benton =

American inventor (1941–2003)

Stephen A. Benton
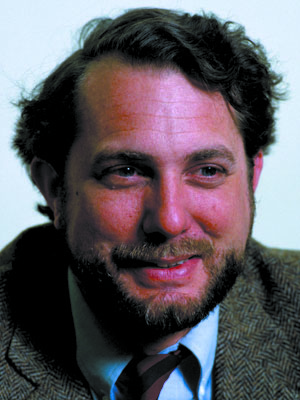
- Born: December 1, 1941; San Francisco, California
- Died: November 9, 2003 (aged 61); Boston, Massachusetts
- Education: Harvard University; Massachusetts Institute of Technology
- Scientific career
- Fields: Holography; Physics
- Workplaces: Polaroid Corporation; Massachusetts Institute of Technology; Harvard University

Stephen Anthony Benton (December 1, 1941 – November 9, 2003) was the inventor of the rainbow hologram (Benton hologram) and a pioneer in medical imaging and fine arts holography. Benton held 14 patents in optical physics and photography, and taught media arts and sciences at Massachusetts Institute of Technology (MIT). He was the E. Rudge ('48) and Nancy Allen Professor of Media & Sciences, and the Director for Center for Advanced Visual Studies (CAVS) at MIT.

== Biography ==
=== Early life and education ===
Benton was born in San Francisco in 1941 and grew up in Santa Barbara, California. He graduated from Santa Barbara High School in 1959. Benton first became interested in optics at 11 when he wore a pair of 3-D glasses to view the Vincent Price movie House of Wax. He recalled, ''There was a realism and a sense of excitement like nothing I had ever felt before. Not only was I amazed, I determined then and there to figure out how it worked''. Benton received his undergraduate degree from Massachusetts Institute of Technology in electrical engineering (1963) and worked with Professor Harold "Doc" Edgerton, a pioneer in stroboscopy. During his undergraduate career, Benton also worked with Edwin H. Land, the co-founder of Polaroid Corp. and inventor of instant photography, in the company's vision research laboratory.

Benton received his M.S. in 1964 and his Ph.D. in 1968 in applied physics at Harvard University.

=== Academic career ===
Benton remained at Harvard University as an assistant professor of applied optics until 1973. From 1980 to 1983, Benton returned to MIT as a visiting scientist in the Laser Research Center. While at MIT, he helped form the Spatial Imaging Research Group in 1982. In 1984, Benton joined the MIT faculty as a founding member of the MIT Media Lab, an interdisciplinary research laboratory at the Massachusetts Institute of Technology devoted to projects at the convergence of technology, multimedia, sciences, art and design. There, he made a lasting impression on his colleagues. "Steve brought a joy and spirit of inventiveness to all that he did," Charles M. Vest, MIT's president, said in a statement. "He was a gifted teacher, scientist, engineer, and artist who personified the best of MIT." Dr. Benton was the founding head of the MIT Program in Media Arts & Sciences from 1987 to 1994 and became the director for the Center for Advanced Visual Studies (CAVS) in 1996. He remained the director of CAVS until his death in 2003.

== Inventions ==
=== White Light Transmission Hologram ===
In 1968, Benton began working on the rainbow hologram or the Benton hologram, at Polaroid Corporation. Rainbow holography makes use of common white light to visualize holograms rather than lasers, thereby leading "holography out of the lab". This type of hologram is commonly seen as the dove on the Visa card. The first rainbow hologram, termed "Motif 1," was presented on a 4-by-5-inch glass plate. It consisted of three chess pieces illuminated by a single white light bulb. Dr. Benton first presented his invention to the optical society in California in 1968. This discovery was also of great interest to the artistic community, as "fiercely bright images which could be manipulated in an artistic context were observed". Since the rainbow hologram was very easy to mass-produce, today, credit card companies and state agencies widely make use of rainbow holograms to deter counterfeiting of credit cards and identification cards.

His research in holography helped in the advancement of holographic technology integral to medical imaging devices like CT and MRI scanners.

=== Real Image Holographic Stereograms ===
In 1988, Dr. Benton patented methods and devices for projecting and recording holographic stereograms. This invention utilized a semi-cylindrical "alcove" display system in front of which an image is projected. This provides the viewer with a wider angle of view compared to the traditional hologram (180 degrees compared to 30 degrees), allowing viewers to look around most of the image content.

=== Holographic Color Control Systems ===
Benton and his students optimized the production of pseudocolor holograms, which was patented in 1989. This had implications as a way of rendering three dimensional computer generated designs.

=== Interactive Holographic Video System ===
In this invention, users are able to interact with and modify an electronic holographic image using a force-feedback (or haptic) device. This device can sense, report the position, and display appropriate forces to the user. The user can feel and modify specified shapes in the workspace. The haptic workspace is linked with the free-standing, spatial image displayed by a holographic video (holovideo) system. This interactive workspace allows a user to see, feel, and interact with synthetic objects that feel like real ones. The display allows these objects to become a part of the user's workspace.

== Artwork ==
Not only was Stephen Benton an accomplished scientist, but also an artist. Benton thought of holography as an ''intersection of art, science and technology'' One of his works, Volumetric Rendering of Magnetic Resonance Imaging--Acquired Data, Digital Hologram is currently on display at Brigham and Women's Hospital. His own works in holography have been displayed at the Museum of Holography on Mercer Street in Manhattan, where he was a curator. Currently, MIT holds the entire collection of Benton's holograms as the Museum of Holography went bankrupt in 1992.

== Professional societies and other honors ==
1976 – 1977: President of the New England section of OSA

1980 – 1984: Chairman for the U.S. National Committee for the International Commission for Optics

1990 – 1993: Board of Directors for the International Society for Optical Engineering (SPIE)

1995: Vinci of Excellence Award at the International Science for Art competition

1999: Vice President for the Society for Imaging Science and Technology

2005: Posthumously awarded the Edwin H. Land Medal

Board of Trustees for the Museum of Holography in New York

Boards of Trustees for Rochester's Museum of Photography at Georges Eastman's House

== In popular culture ==
The Benton family from the animated TV series Jem and The Holograms was named after the holography pioneer.
