= Holography =

Using wave optics to reproduce a three-dimensional light field

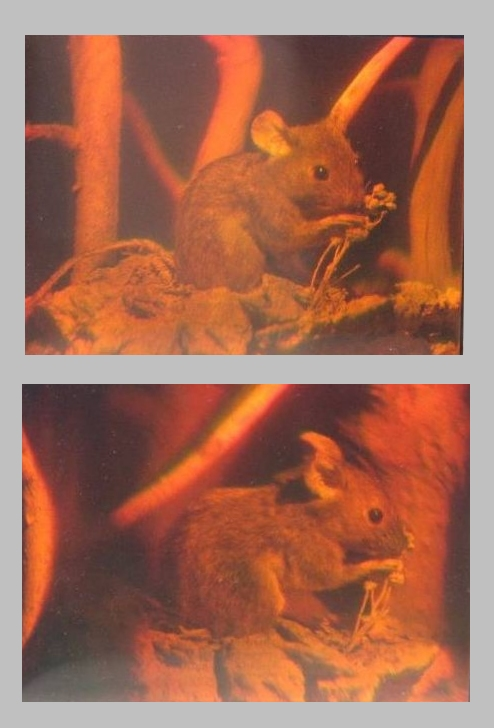
Two photographs of a single hologram taken from different viewpoints

Holography is an imaging technique that allows a wavefront to be recorded and later reconstructed. It is best known as a method of generating three-dimensional images, and has a wide range of other uses, including data storage, microscopy, and interferometry.

A hologram is a recording of an interference pattern that can reproduce a 3D light field using diffraction. In general usage, a hologram is a recording of any type of wavefront in the form of an interference pattern. It can be created by capturing light from a real scene, or it can be generated by a computer, in which case it is known as a computer-generated hologram, which can show virtual objects or scenes. Optical holography needs a laser light to record the light field. The reproduced light field can generate an image that has the depth and parallax of the original scene. Holograms are usually unintelligible when viewed under diffuse ambient light. When suitably lit, the interference pattern diffracts the light into an accurate reproduction of the original light field, and the objects that were in it exhibit visual depth cues such as parallax and perspective that change realistically with the different angles of viewing. That is, the view of the image from different angles shows the subject viewed from similar angles.

A hologram is traditionally generated by overlaying a second wavefront, known as the reference beam, onto a wavefront of interest. This generates an interference pattern, which is then captured on a physical medium. When the recorded interference pattern is later illuminated by the second wavefront, it is diffracted to recreate the original wavefront. The 3D image from a hologram can often be viewed with non-laser light. However, in common practice, major image quality compromises are made to remove the need for laser illumination to view the hologram.

Holographic portraiture often resorts to a non-holographic intermediate imaging procedure, to avoid the dangerous high-powered pulsed lasers which would be needed to optically "freeze" moving subjects as perfectly as the extremely motion-intolerant holographic recording process requires. Early holography required high-power and expensive lasers. Currently, mass-produced low-cost laser diodes, such as those found on DVD recorders and used in other common applications, can be used to make holograms. They have made holography much more accessible to low-budget researchers, artists, and dedicated hobbyists.

Most holograms produced are of static objects, but systems for displaying changing scenes on dynamic holographic displays are now being developed.

In principle, it is possible to make a hologram for any type of wave.

== Etymology ==
The word holography comes from the Greek words ὅλος (holos; "whole") and γραφή (graphē; "writing" or "drawing").

== History ==
Introduction to Holography (1972 educational film)

The Hungarian-British physicist Dennis Gabor invented holography in 1948 while he was looking for a way to improve image resolution in electron microscopes. Gabor's work was built on pioneering work in the field of X-ray microscopy by other scientists including Mieczysław Wolfke in 1920 and William Lawrence Bragg in 1939. The formulation of holography was an unexpected result of Gabor's research into improving electron microscopes at the British Thomson-Houston Company (BTH) in Rugby, England, and the company filed a patent in December 1947 (patent GB685286). The technique as originally invented is still used in electron microscopy, where it is known as electron holography. Gabor was awarded the Nobel Prize in Physics in 1971 "for his invention and development of the holographic method".

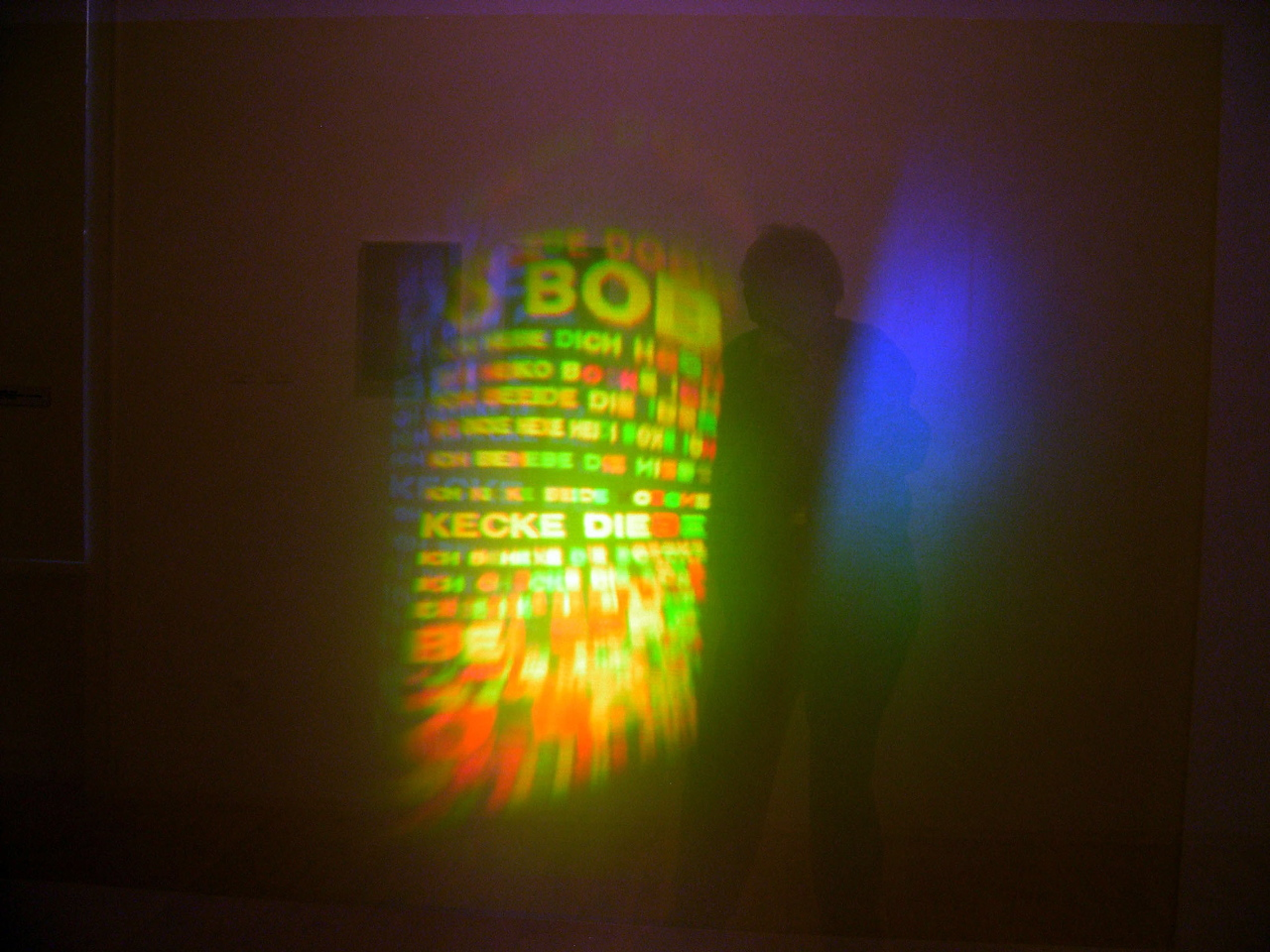
Horizontal symmetric text, by Dieter Jung

Optical holography did not really advance until the development of the laser in 1960. The development of the laser enabled the first practical optical holograms that recorded 3D objects to be made in 1962 by Yuri Denisyuk in the Soviet Union and by Emmett Leith and Juris Upatnieks at the University of Michigan, US.

Early optical holograms used silver halide photographic emulsions as the recording medium. They were not very efficient as the produced diffraction grating absorbed much of the incident light. Various methods of converting the variation in transmission to a variation in refractive index (known as "bleaching") were developed which enabled much more efficient holograms to be produced.

A major advance in the field of holography was made by Stephen Benton, who invented a way to create holograms that can be viewed with natural light instead of lasers. These are called rainbow holograms.

== Basics of holography ==
Recording a hologram

Displaying a hologram

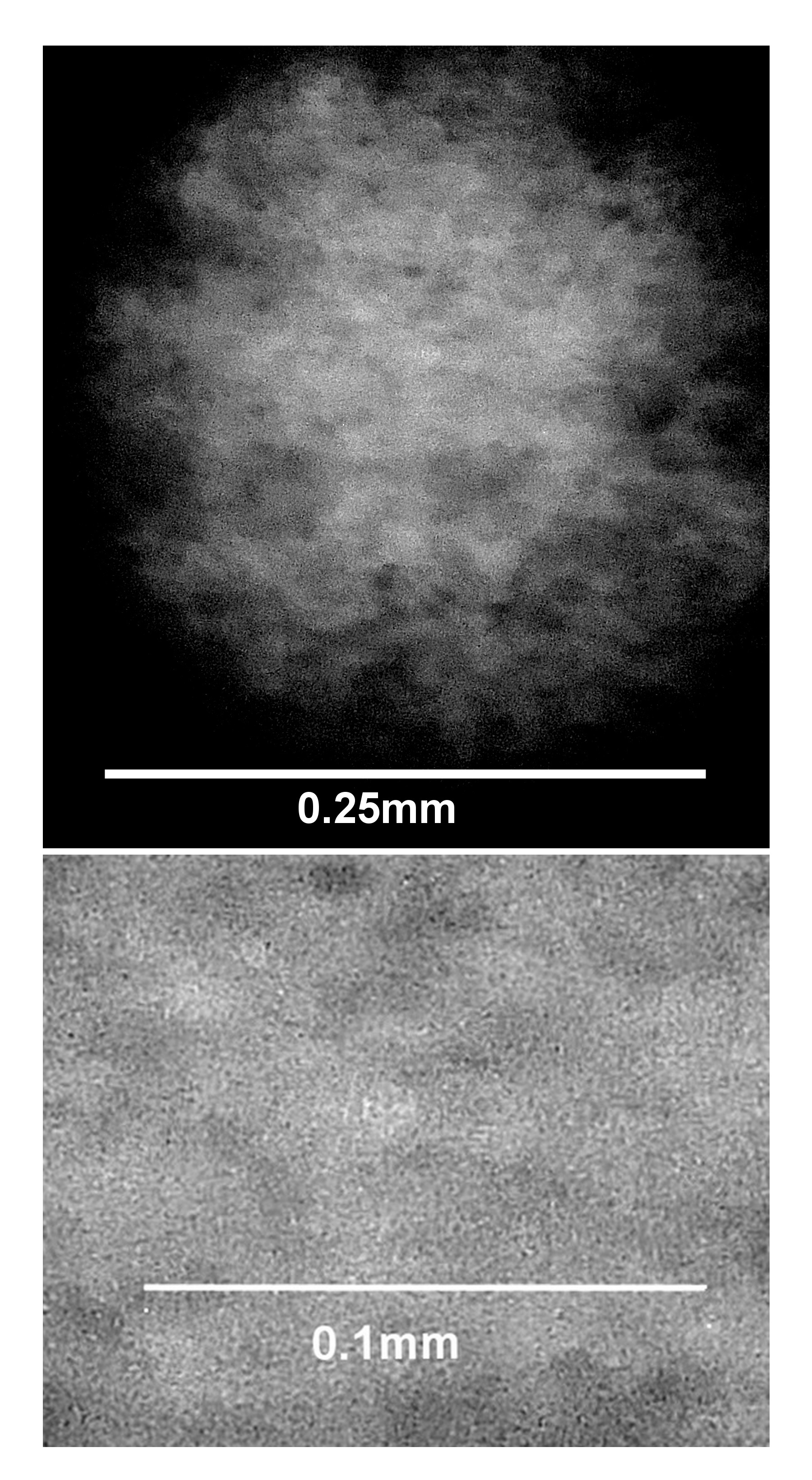
A small part of an unbleached transmission hologram viewed through a microscope. The hologram is a recording of a toy van and car. It is no more possible to discern the subject of the hologram from this pattern than it is to identify what music has been recorded by looking at a CD surface. The holographic information is recorded by the speckle pattern.

Holography is a technique for recording and displaying light fields. A light field is generally the result of a light source scattered off objects. Holography can be thought of as somewhat similar to sound recording, whereby a sound field created by vibrating matter like musical instruments or vocal cords, is encoded in such a way that it can be reproduced later, without the presence of the original vibrating matter. However, it is even more similar to Ambisonic sound recording in which any listening angle of a sound field can be reproduced in the reproduction.

=== Classification ===
According to the Russian national standards GOST R 59321.1-2021, holography is divided into three main branches based on the method of recording and reconstructing the wavefront:

- Analog holography – the hologram is recorded on a physical photosensitive material (photographic plate, photopolymer, etc.) and reconstructed optically by illuminating the developed hologram with the reference beam.
- Digital holography – the interference pattern is captured by an electronic sensor (CCD or CMOS camera) and the wavefront is numerically reconstructed using algorithms that model the diffraction process.
- Computer holography (or computer-generated holography) – the holographic interference pattern is synthesized by a computer without a physical recording step. The resulting fringe pattern can be printed or displayed on a spatial light modulator to reconstruct the desired wavefront.

=== Laser ===
In laser holography, the hologram is recorded using a source of laser light, which is in phase. Various setups may be used, and several types of holograms can be made, but all involve the interaction of light coming from different directions and producing a microscopic interference pattern which a plate, film, or other medium photographically records.

In one common arrangement, the laser beam is split into two, one known as the object beam and the other as the reference beam. The object beam is expanded by passing it through a lens and used to illuminate the subject. The recording medium is located where this light, after being reflected or scattered by the subject, will strike it. The edges of the medium will ultimately serve as a window through which the subject is seen, so its location is chosen with that in mind. The reference beam is expanded and made to shine directly on the medium, where it interacts with the light coming from the subject to create the desired interference pattern.

Like conventional photography, holography requires an appropriate exposure time to correctly affect the recording medium. Unlike conventional photography, during the exposure the light source, the optical elements, the recording medium, and the subject must all remain motionless relative to each other, to within about a quarter of the wavelength of the light, or the interference pattern will be blurred and the hologram spoiled. With living subjects and some unstable materials, that is only possible if a very intense and extremely brief pulse of laser light is used, a hazardous procedure which is rarely done outside of scientific and industrial laboratory settings. Exposures lasting several seconds to several minutes, using a much lower-powered continuously operating laser, are typical.

=== Apparatus ===
A hologram can be made by shining part of the light beam directly into the recording medium, and the other part onto the object in such a way that some of the scattered light falls onto the recording medium. A more flexible arrangement for recording a hologram requires the laser beam to be aimed through a series of elements that change it in different ways. The first element is a beam splitter that divides the beam into two identical beams, each aimed in different directions:

- One beam (known as the 'illumination' or 'object beam') is spread using lenses and directed onto the scene using mirrors. Some of the light scattered (reflected) from the scene then falls onto the recording medium.
- The second beam (known as the 'reference beam') is also spread through the use of lenses, but is directed so that it does not come in contact with the scene, and instead travels directly onto the recording medium.

Several different materials can be used as the recording medium. One of the most common is a film very similar to photographic film (silver halide photographic emulsion), but with much smaller light-reactive grains (preferably with diameters less than 20 nm), making it capable of the much higher resolution that holograms require. A layer of this recording medium (e.g., silver halide) is attached to a transparent substrate, which is commonly glass, but may also be plastic.

=== Process ===
When the two laser beams reach the recording medium, their light waves intersect and interfere with each other. It is this interference pattern that is imprinted on the recording medium. The pattern itself is seemingly random, as it represents the way in which the scene's light interfered with the original light source – but not the original light source itself. The interference pattern can be considered an encoded version of the scene, requiring a particular key – the original light source – in order to view its contents.

This missing key is provided later by shining a laser, identical to the one used to record the hologram, onto the developed film. When this beam illuminates the hologram, it is diffracted by the hologram's surface pattern. This produces a light field identical to the one originally produced by the scene and scattered onto the hologram.

=== Comparison with photography ===
Holography may be better understood via an examination of its differences from ordinary photography:

- A hologram represents a recording of information regarding the light that came from the original scene as scattered in a range of directions rather than summed from all directions as in a photograph.
- A photograph can be recorded using normal light sources (sunlight or electric lighting) whereas a laser is required to record a hologram.
- A lens is required in photography to record the image, whereas in holography, the light from the object is scattered directly onto the recording medium.
- A holographic recording requires a second light beam (the reference beam) to be directed onto the recording medium.
- A photograph can be viewed in a wide range of lighting conditions, whereas holograms can only be viewed with specific forms of illumination.
- When a photograph is cut in half, each piece shows half of the scene. When a hologram is cut in half, the whole scene can still be seen in each piece. This is because, whereas each point in a photograph only represents light scattered from a single point in the scene, each point on a holographic recording includes information about light scattered from every point in the scene. It can be thought of as viewing a street outside a house through a large window, then through a smaller window. One can see all of the same things through the smaller window (by moving the head to change the viewing angle), but the viewer can see more at once through the large window.
- A photographic stereogram is a two-dimensional representation that can produce a three-dimensional effect but only from one point of view, whereas the reproduced viewing range of a hologram adds many more depth perception cues that were present in the original scene. These cues are recognized by the human brain and translated into the same perception of a three-dimensional image as when the original scene might have been viewed.
- A photograph clearly maps out the light field of the original scene. The developed hologram's surface consists of a very fine, seemingly random pattern, which appears to bear no relationship to the scene it recorded.

== Physics of holography ==
For a better understanding of the process, it is necessary to understand interference and diffraction. Interference occurs when one or more wavefronts are superimposed. Diffraction occurs when a wavefront encounters an object. The process of producing a holographic reconstruction is explained below purely in terms of interference and diffraction. It is somewhat simplified but is accurate enough to give an understanding of how the holographic process works.

For those unfamiliar with these concepts, it is worthwhile to read those articles before reading further in this article.

=== Plane wavefronts ===
A diffraction grating is a structure with a repeating pattern. A simple example is a metal plate with slits cut at regular intervals. A light wave that is incident on a grating is split into several waves; the direction of these diffracted waves is determined by the grating spacing and the wavelength of the light.

A simple hologram can be made by superimposing two plane waves from the same light source on a holographic recording medium. The two waves interfere, giving a straight-line fringe pattern whose intensity varies sinusoidally across the medium. The spacing of the fringe pattern is determined by the angle between the two waves, and by the wavelength of the light.

The recorded light pattern is a diffraction grating. When it is illuminated by only one of the waves used to create it, it can be shown that one of the diffracted waves emerges at the same angle at which the second wave was originally incident, so that the second wave has been 'reconstructed'. Thus, the recorded light pattern is a holographic recording as defined above.

=== Point sources ===
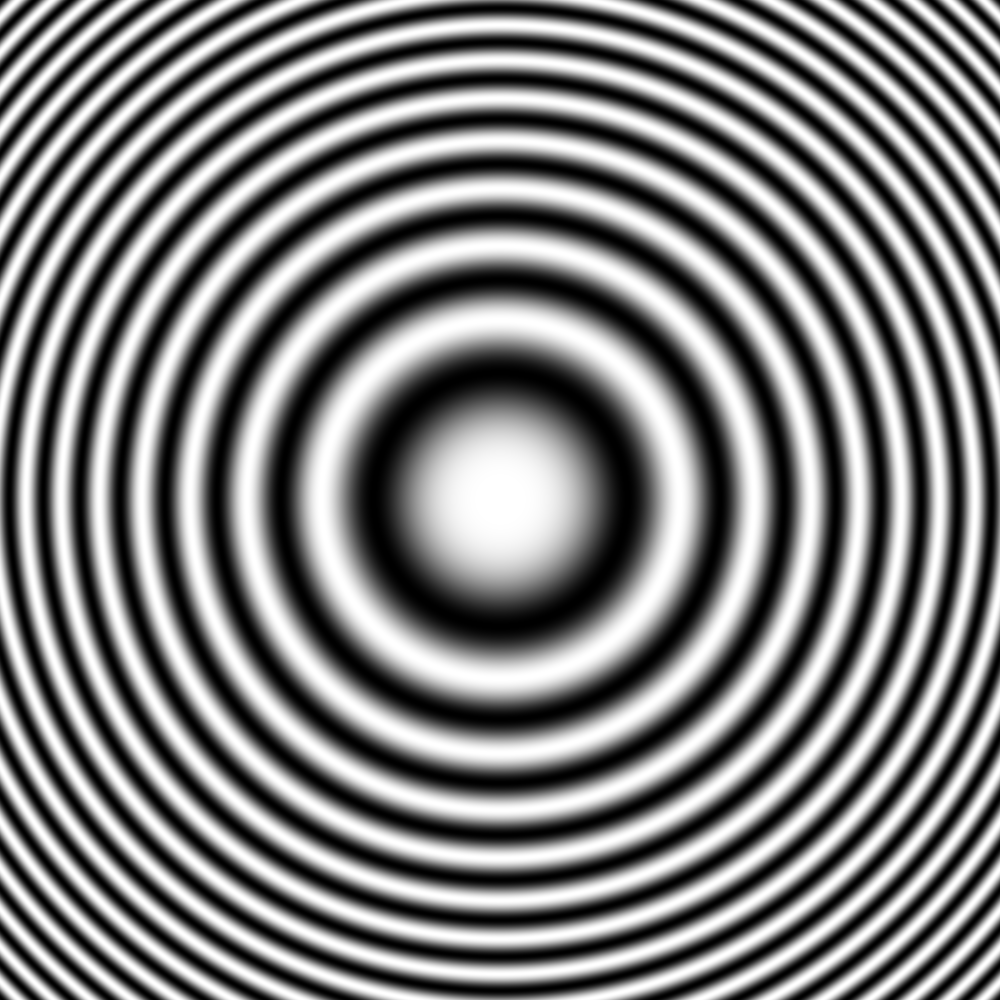
Sinusoidal zone plate

If the recording medium is illuminated with a point source and a normally incident plane wave, the resulting pattern is a sinusoidal zone plate, which acts as a negative Fresnel lens whose focal length is equal to the separation of the point source and the recording plane.

When a plane wave-front illuminates a negative lens, it is expanded into a wave that appears to diverge from the focal point of the lens. Thus, when the recorded pattern is illuminated with the original plane wave, some of the light is diffracted into a diverging beam equivalent to the original spherical wave; a holographic recording of the point source has been created.

When the plane wave is incident at a non-normal angle at the time of recording, the pattern formed is more complex, but still acts as a negative lens if it is illuminated at the original angle.

=== Complex objects ===
To record a hologram of a complex object, a laser beam is first split into two beams of light. One beam illuminates the object, which then scatters light onto the recording medium. According to diffraction theory, each point in the object acts as a point source of light so the recording medium can be considered to be illuminated by a set of point sources located at varying distances from the medium.

The second (reference) beam illuminates the recording medium directly. Each point source wave interferes with the reference beam, giving rise to its own sinusoidal zone plate in the recording medium. The resulting pattern is the sum of all these 'zone plates', which combine to produce a random (speckle) pattern as in the photograph above.

When the hologram is illuminated by the original reference beam, each of the individual zone plates reconstructs the object wave that produced it, and these individual wavefronts are combined to reconstruct the whole of the object beam. The viewer perceives a wavefront that is identical with the wavefront scattered from the object onto the recording medium, so that it appears that the object is still in place even if it has been removed.

== Digital and computer holography ==
=== Digital holography ===
Holograms can be recorded using digital technology, using an electronic sensor, such as a CCD or CMOS camera. The camera sensor records the interference pattern between the object and reference waves, which can then be stored in a computer. The complex wavefront (amplitude and phase) can be reconstructed using an iterative technique by simulating light propagation using scalar diffraction theory – for instance, via the Fresnel transform, angular spectrum method, or convolution approach. This allows one to capture the full optical field in a single exposure and to digitally refocus the image after the fact, a capability absent in classical analog holography.

Many algorithms exist for extracting the phase and amplitude from the recorded hologram. The most widespread Fourier transform method works by isolating one of the side lobes in the spatial frequency spectrum of an off-axis hologram, enabling real-time acquisition from a single frame at the cost of discarding part of the signal. The Local least squares algorithms family for complex wave retrieval, by contrast, treats the reconstruction as an inverse problem and recovers the full complex amplitude by incorporating priors on the reference waive or noise, often yielding superior fidelity and contrast.

Information about wavefront can also be measured without a separate reference beam by applying phase retrieval techniques, where the phase is recovered from a sequence of intensity measurements recorded at different planes. A 2014 experimental comparison of holographic and iterative phase‑retrieval methods found that the holographic approach provided high contrast free of boundary artifacts, while the iterative methods achieved a lower normalized mean‑square error at the expense of edge diffraction artifacts.

=== Computer-generated holography ===
Computer-generated holography (CGH) is the numerical synthesis of an interference pattern without the need for a physical object or reference beam. The complex field of a virtual object is calculated mathematically, and the resulting fringe pattern is output to a transparency, spatial light modulator (SLM), or fabricated by lithography. When illuminated, the CGH reconstructs the desired wavefront, producing a three-dimensional image of a synthetic object. CGH is widely used in beam shaping, optical tweezers, three-dimensional displays, and adaptive optics.

A computer-generated hologram is created by digitally modeling and combining two wavefronts to generate an interference pattern image. This image can then be printed onto a mask or film and illuminated with an appropriate light source to reconstruct the desired wavefront. Alternatively, the interference pattern image can be directly displayed on a dynamic holographic display.

== Applications ==
=== Art ===
Early on, artists saw the potential of holography as a medium and gained access to science laboratories to create their work. Holographic art is often the result of collaborations between scientists and artists, although some holographers would regard themselves as both artists and scientists.

Salvador Dalí claimed to have been the first to employ holography in art. He was certainly the first and best-known surrealist to do so, but the 1972 New York exhibit of Dalí holograms had been preceded by the holographic art exhibition that was held at the Cranbrook Academy of Art in Michigan in 1968 and by the one at the Finch College gallery in New York in 1970, which attracted national media attention. In Great Britain, Margaret Benyon began using holography as an artistic medium in the late 1960s and had a solo exhibition at the University of Nottingham art gallery in 1969. This was followed in 1970 by a solo show at the Lisson Gallery in London, which was billed as the "first London expo of holograms and stereoscopic paintings".

During the 1970s, a number of art studios and schools were established, each with their particular approach to holography. Among these were the San Francisco School of Holography established by Lloyd Cross, The Museum of Holography in New York founded by Rosemary (Posy) H. Jackson, the Royal College of Art in London, and the Lake Forest College Symposiums organised by Tung Jeong. None of these studios still exist; however, there is the Center for the Holographic Arts in New York and the HOLOcenter in Seoul, which offers artists a place to create and exhibit work.

During the 1980s, many artists who worked with holography helped the diffusion of this so-called "new medium" in the art world, such as Harriet Casdin-Silver of the United States, Dieter Jung of Germany, and Moysés Baumstein of Brazil, each one searching for a proper "language" to use with the three-dimensional work, avoiding the simple holographic reproduction of a sculpture or object. For instance, in Brazil, many concrete poets (Augusto de Campos, Décio Pignatari, Julio Plaza and José Wagner Garcia, associated with Moysés Baumstein) found in holography a way to express themselves and to renew concrete poetry.

A small but active group of artists still integrate holographic elements into their work. Some are associated with novel holographic techniques; for example, artist Matt Brand employed computational mirror design to eliminate image distortion from specular holography.

The MIT Museum and Jonathan Ross both have extensive collections of holography and online catalogues of art holograms.

=== Data storage ===
Holographic data storage is a technique that can store information at high density inside crystals or photopolymers. The ability to store large amounts of information in some kind of medium is of great importance, as many electronic products incorporate storage devices. As current storage techniques such as Blu-ray Disc reach the limit of possible data density (due to the diffraction-limited size of the writing beams), holographic storage has the potential to become the next generation of popular storage media. The advantage of this type of data storage is that the volume of the recording media is used instead of just the surface. Currently available SLMs can produce about 1000 different images a second at 1024×1024-bit resolution which would result in about one-gigabit-per-second writing speed.

In 2005, companies such as Optware and Maxell produced a 120 mm disc that uses a holographic layer to store data to a potential 3.9 TB, a format called Holographic Versatile Disc. As of September 2014, no commercial product has been released.

Another company, InPhase Technologies, was developing a competing format, but went bankrupt in 2011 and all its assets were sold to Akonia Holographics, LLC.

While many holographic data storage models have used "page-based" storage, where each recorded hologram holds a large amount of data, more recent research into using submicrometre-sized "microholograms" has resulted in several potential 3D optical data storage solutions. While this approach to data storage can not attain the high data rates of page-based storage, the tolerances, technological hurdles, and cost of producing a commercial product are significantly lower.

=== Dynamic holography ===
In static holography, recording, developing and reconstructing occur sequentially, and a permanent hologram is produced.

There also exist holographic materials that do not need the developing process and can record a hologram in a very short time. This allows one to use holography to perform some simple operations in an all-optical way. Examples of applications of such real-time holograms include phase-conjugate mirrors ("time-reversal" of light), optical cache memories, image processing (pattern recognition of time-varying images), and optical computing.

The amount of processed information can be very high (terabits/s), since the operation is performed in parallel on a whole image. This compensates for the fact that the recording time, which is in the order of a microsecond, is still very long compared to the processing time of an electronic computer. The optical processing performed by a dynamic hologram is also much less flexible than electronic processing. On one side, one has to perform the operation always on the whole image, and on the other side, the operation a hologram can perform is basically either a multiplication or a phase conjugation. In optics, addition and Fourier transform are already easily performed in linear materials, the latter simply by a lens. This enables some applications, such as a device that compares images in an optical way.

The search for novel nonlinear optical materials for dynamic holography is an active area of research. The most common materials are photorefractive crystals, but in semiconductors or semiconductor heterostructures (such as quantum wells), atomic vapors and gases, plasmas and even liquids, it was possible to generate holograms.

A particularly promising application is optical phase conjugation. It allows the removal of the wavefront distortions a light beam receives when passing through an aberrating medium, by sending it back through the same aberrating medium with a conjugated phase. This is useful, for example, in free-space optical communications to compensate for atmospheric turbulence (the phenomenon that gives rise to the twinkling of starlight).

=== Hobbyist use ===
Peace Within Reach, a Denisyuk DCG hologram by amateur Dave Battin

Since the beginning of holography, many holographers have explored its uses and displayed them to the public.

In 1971, Lloyd Cross opened the San Francisco School of Holography and taught amateurs how to make holograms using only a small (typically 5 mW) helium-neon laser and inexpensive home-made equipment. Holography had been supposed to require a very expensive metal optical table set-up to lock all the involved elements down in place and damp any vibrations that could blur the interference fringes and ruin the hologram. Cross's home-brew alternative was a sandbox made of a cinder block retaining wall on a plywood base, supported on stacks of old tires to isolate it from ground vibrations, and filled with sand that had been washed to remove dust. The laser was securely mounted atop the cinder block wall. The mirrors and simple lenses needed for directing, splitting and expanding the laser beam were affixed to short lengths of PVC pipe, which were stuck into the sand at the desired locations. The subject and the photographic plate holder were similarly supported within the sandbox. The holographer turned off the room light, blocked the laser beam near its source using a small relay-controlled shutter, loaded a plate into the holder in the dark, left the room, waited a few minutes to let everything settle, then made the exposure by remotely operating the laser shutter.

In 1979, Jason Sapan opened the Holographic Studios in New York City. Since then, they have been involved in the production of many holographs for many artists and companies.

Many of these holographers would go on to produce art holograms. In 1983, Fred Unterseher, a co-founder of the San Francisco School of Holography and a well-known holographic artist, published the Holography Handbook, an easy-to-read guide to making holograms at home. This brought in a new wave of holographers and provided simple methods for using the then-available AGFA silver halide recording materials.

In 2000, Frank DeFreitas published the Shoebox Holography Book and introduced the use of inexpensive laser pointers to countless hobbyists. For many years, it had been assumed that certain characteristics of semiconductor laser diodes made them virtually useless for creating holograms, but when they were eventually put to the test of practical experiment, it was found that not only was this untrue, but that some actually provided a coherence length much greater than that of traditional helium-neon gas lasers. This was a very important development for amateurs, as the price of red laser diodes had dropped from hundreds of dollars in the early 1980s to about $5 after they entered the mass market as a component pulled from CD, or later, DVD players from the mid-1980s onwards. Now, there are thousands of amateur holographers worldwide.

By late 2000, holography kits with inexpensive laser pointer diodes entered the mainstream consumer market. These kits enabled students, teachers, and hobbyists to make several kinds of holograms without specialized equipment, and became popular gift items by 2005. The introduction of holography kits with self-developing plates in 2003 made it possible for hobbyists to create holograms without the bother of wet chemical processing.

In 2006, a large number of surplus holography-quality green lasers (Coherent C315) became available and put dichromated gelatin (DCG) holography within the reach of the amateur holographer. The holography community was surprised at the amazing sensitivity of DCG to green light. It had been assumed that this sensitivity would be uselessly slight or non-existent. Jeff Blyth responded with the G307 formulation of DCG to increase the speed and sensitivity to these new lasers.

Kodak and Agfa, the former major suppliers of holography-quality silver halide plates and films, are no longer in the market. While other manufacturers have helped fill the void, many amateurs are now making their own materials. The favorite formulations are dichromated gelatin, Methylene-Blue-sensitised dichromated gelatin, and diffusion method silver halide preparations. Jeff Blyth has published very accurate methods for making these in a small lab or garage.

A small group of amateurs are even constructing their own pulsed lasers to make holograms of living subjects and other unsteady or moving objects.

=== Holographic interferometry ===
Holographic interferometry (HI) is a technique that enables static and dynamic displacements of objects with optically rough surfaces to be measured to optical interferometric precision (i.e. to fractions of a wavelength of light). It can also be used to detect optical-path-length variations in transparent media, which enables, for example, fluid flow to be visualized and analyzed. It can also be used to generate contours representing the form of the surface or the isodose regions in radiation dosimetry.

It has been widely used to measure stress, strain, and vibration in engineering structures.

=== Interferometric microscopy ===
The hologram keeps the information on the amplitude and phase of the field. Several holograms may keep information about the same distribution of light, emitted to various directions. The numerical analysis of such holograms allows one to emulate large numerical aperture, which, in turn, enables enhancement of the resolution of optical microscopy. The corresponding technique is called interferometric microscopy. Recent achievements of interferometric microscopy allow one to approach the quarter-wavelength limit of resolution.

=== Sensors or biosensors ===
The hologram is made with a modified material that interacts with certain molecules generating a change in the fringe periodicity or refractive index, therefore, the color of the holographic reflection.

=== Security ===
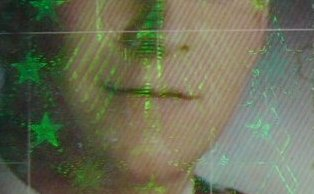
Identigram as a security element in a German identity card

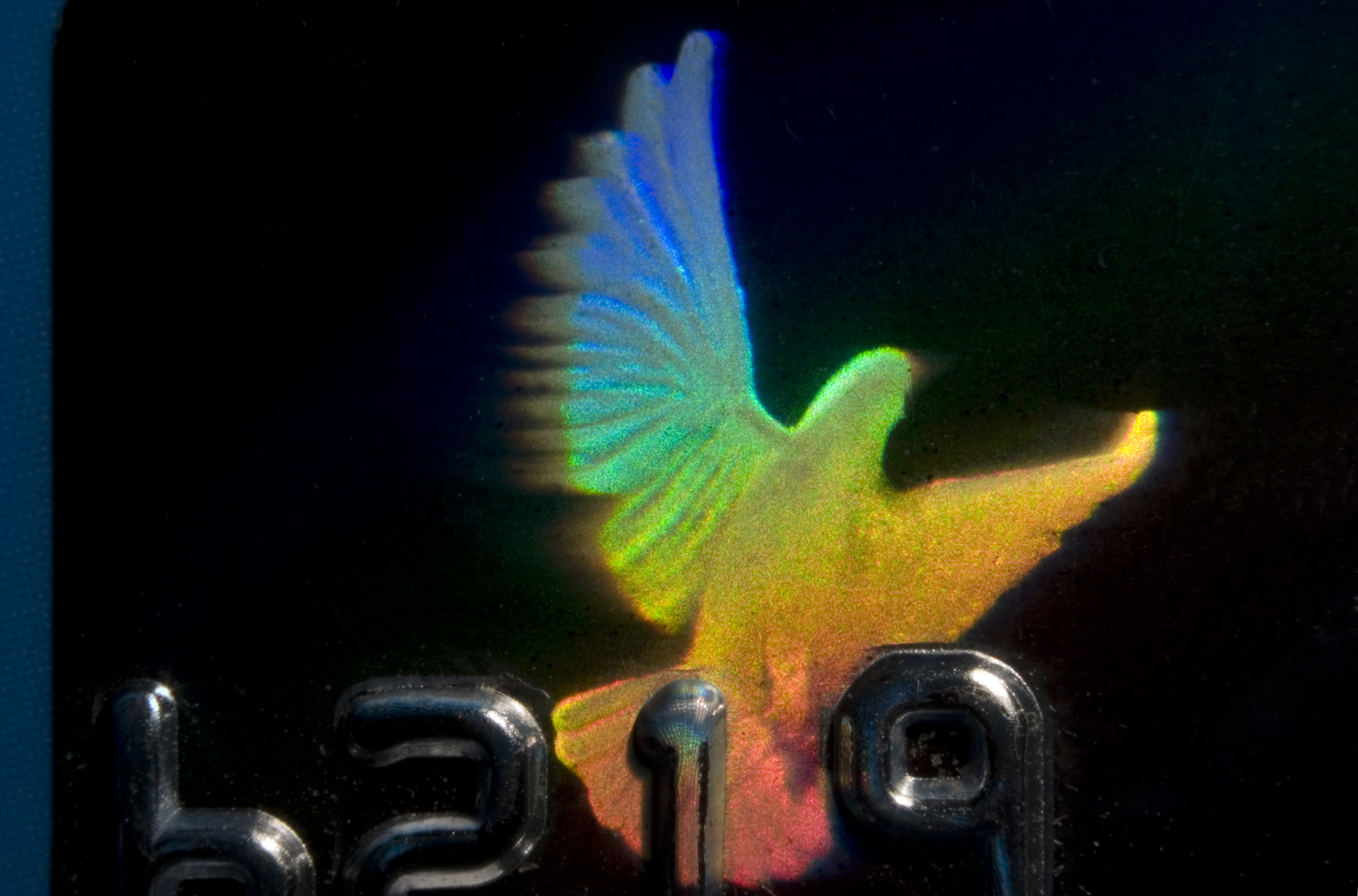
Dove hologram used on some credit cards

Holograms are often used for security, as they are replicated from a master hologram that requires expensive, specialized and technologically advanced equipment, and are thus difficult to forge. They are used widely in many currencies, such as the Brazilian 20, 50, and 100-reais notes; British 5, 10, 20 and 50-pound notes; South Korean 5000, 10,000, and 50,000-won notes; Japanese 5000 and 10,000 yen notes, Indian 50, 100, 500 rupee notes; and all the currently-circulating banknotes of the Canadian dollar, Croatian kuna, Danish krone, and Euro. They can also be found in credit and bank cards as well as passports, ID cards, books, food packaging, DVDs, and sports equipment. Such holograms come in a variety of forms, from adhesive strips that are laminated on packaging for fast-moving consumer goods to holographic tags on electronic products. They often contain textual or pictorial elements to protect identities and separate genuine articles from counterfeits.

Holographic scanners are in use in post offices, larger shipping firms, and automated conveyor systems to determine the three-dimensional size of a package. They are often used in tandem with checkweighers to allow automated pre-packing of given volumes, such as a truck or pallet for bulk shipment of goods. Holograms produced in elastomers can be used as stress-strain reporters due to its elasticity and compressibility, the pressure and force applied are correlated to the reflected wavelength, therefore its color. Holography technique can also be effectively used for radiation dosimetry.

==== High-security registration plates ====
Security holograms can be used on license plates for vehicles such as cars and motorcycles. As of April 2019, holographic license plates are required on vehicles in parts of India to aid in identification, especially in cases of car theft. Such number plates hold digital data of vehicles, and they have a unique ID number and a sticker.

=== Visual optics ===
Holographic methods can measure the optical aberrations of the eye. One approach, known as holographic modal wavefront sensing, uses diffractive patterns that respond selectively to particular aberration modes. The intensities of the resulting diffraction spots provide estimates of components such as defocus, astigmatism, and higher-order aberrations, making the technique applicable to ocular aberrometry and adaptive optics.

Digital holography also supports quantitative imaging of ocular structures. When paired with low-coherence interferometry, coherence gating isolates light returning from a selected depth, while numerical reconstruction recovers the corresponding optical section. This principle has been used to image the cornea and iris in enucleated eyes. A digital holographic microscope has also recorded structures of the living human retina, using the cornea and crystalline lens as part of the imaging system. Because digital holography preserves phase information, ocular aberrations can also be estimated and corrected computationally during image reconstruction. This form of digital adaptive optics reduces reliance on a separate wavefront sensor and deformable optical element.

Computer-generated holography applies the same general principle in the opposite direction by shaping the wavefront delivered to the eye. Prototype holographic near-eye displays use spatial light modulators to encode a viewer's refractive prescription and ocular aberrations into the displayed wavefront, allowing the image itself to compensate for some optical defects. Other systems combine computer-generated holograms with pupil tracking to send test images through selected regions of the pupil. One experimental device used this method to simulate postoperative vision in patients with cataracts before surgery.

== Holography using other types of waves ==
In principle, it is possible to make a hologram for any wave.

Electron holography is the application of holography techniques to electron waves rather than light waves. Electron holography was invented by Dennis Gabor to improve the resolution and avoid the aberrations of the transmission electron microscope. Today it is commonly used to study electric and magnetic fields in thin films, as magnetic and electric fields can shift the phase of the interfering wave passing through the sample. The principle of electron holography can also be applied to interference lithography.

Acoustic holography enables sound maps of an object to be generated. Measurements of the acoustic field are made at many points close to the object. These measurements are digitally processed to produce the "images" of the object.

Atomic holography has evolved out of the development of the basic elements of atom optics. With the Fresnel diffraction lens and atomic mirrors atomic holography follows a natural step in the development of the physics (and applications) of atomic beams. Recent developments including atomic mirrors and especially ridged mirrors have provided the tools necessary for the creation of atomic holograms, although such holograms have not yet been commercialized.

Neutron beam holography has been used to see the inside of solid objects.

Holograms with x-rays are generated by using synchrotrons or x-ray free-electron lasers as radiation sources and pixelated detectors such as CCDs as recording medium. The reconstruction is then retrieved via computation. Due to the shorter wavelength of x-rays compared to visible light, this approach allows imaging objects with higher spatial resolution. As free-electron lasers can provide ultrashort and x-ray pulses in the range of femtoseconds which are intense and coherent, x-ray holography has been used to capture ultrafast dynamic processes.

== In fiction ==
Holography has been widely referred to in movies, novels, and TV, usually in science fiction, starting in the late 1970s. Science fiction writers absorbed the urban legends surrounding holography that had been spread by overly-enthusiastic scientists and entrepreneurs trying to market the idea. This had the effect of giving the public overly high expectations of the capability of holography, due to the unrealistic depictions of it in most fiction, where they are fully three-dimensional computer projections that are sometimes tactile through the use of force fields. Examples of this type of depiction include the hologram of Princess Leia in Star Wars, Arnold Rimmer from Red Dwarf, who was later converted to "hard light" to make him solid, and the Holodeck and Emergency Medical Hologram from Star Trek.

Holography has served as an inspiration for many video games with science fiction elements. In many titles, fictional holographic technology has been used to reflect real-life misrepresentations of potential military use of holograms, such as the "mirage tanks" in Command & Conquer: Red Alert 2 that can disguise themselves as trees. Player characters are able to use holographic decoys in games such as Halo: Reach and Crysis 2 to confuse and distract the enemy.

Fictional depictions of holograms have, however, inspired technological advances in other fields, such as augmented reality, that promise to fulfill the fictional depictions of holograms by other means.

== See also ==
- 3D file formats
- Computer-generated holography
- Holographic display
- Augmented reality
- Australian Holographics
- Autostereoscopy
- Digital holographic microscopy
- Digital planar holography
- Fog display
- Lenticular printing
- Holographic principle
- Holonomic brain theory
- Hogel Processing Unit
- Integral imaging
- List of emerging technologies
- Phase-coherent holography
- Plasmon – possible applications (full color holography)
- Tomography
- Volumetric display
- Volumetric printing
