= Pablo Delgado =

British artist

Pablo Delgado is a Mexico-born and London-based street artist who emerged in 2011 and rose to prominence in the London street-art scene. Since 2012 he has been decorating East London's street corners. His early work consisted of miniature doorways pasted up on the edges of walls. Soon, Delgado began expanding into detailed narratives, meticulously depicting hosts of people, animals, and objects in minutia around London.

== Biography ==
His early work consisted of miniature doorways pasted up on the edges of walls. Soon, Delgado began expanding into detailed narratives, meticulously depicting hosts of people, animals, and objects in minutia around London.

His style involves taking imagery from mass media and popular culture, stripping it of colour before arranging the tiny figures into surreal scenes and compositions. He is known for his use of distinctive black shadows, cast on the pavement.

== Works ==
In December 2012 Pablo Delgado painted the Village Underground wall in Shoreditch, London.

== Exhibitions ==
In October 2012, Delgado made his debut solo show. at the Pure Evil Gallery in Shoreditch, London.

In May 2013, Delgado exhibited at the Dulwich Street Art Festival in 2013.

In September 2013, Delgado exhibited at the Street Museum of Art, Montreal, Canada.

In November 2013, his little artworks were the first commission for the East Wing Biennale at the Courtauld Institute of Art.

In May 2014, Delgado had a solo exhibition entitled Even Less at Howard Griffin Gallery in Shoreditch, London. Gallery owner Richard Howard-Griffin explained: “He wanted to make an exhibition that looks as though it isn’t there, so when you walk in it doesn’t look as though there is an exhibition, you see nothing, but when you look around at the details you can see there are narratives and stories going on.”

In February 2015, Delgado opened his first exhibition is the US at the Howard Griffin Gallery, Los Angeles

In November 2017 Delgado released a series of artworks with Nelly Duff entitled 'The Fastest Loneliest Racer.'
