= Petra Feriancová =

Slovak artist

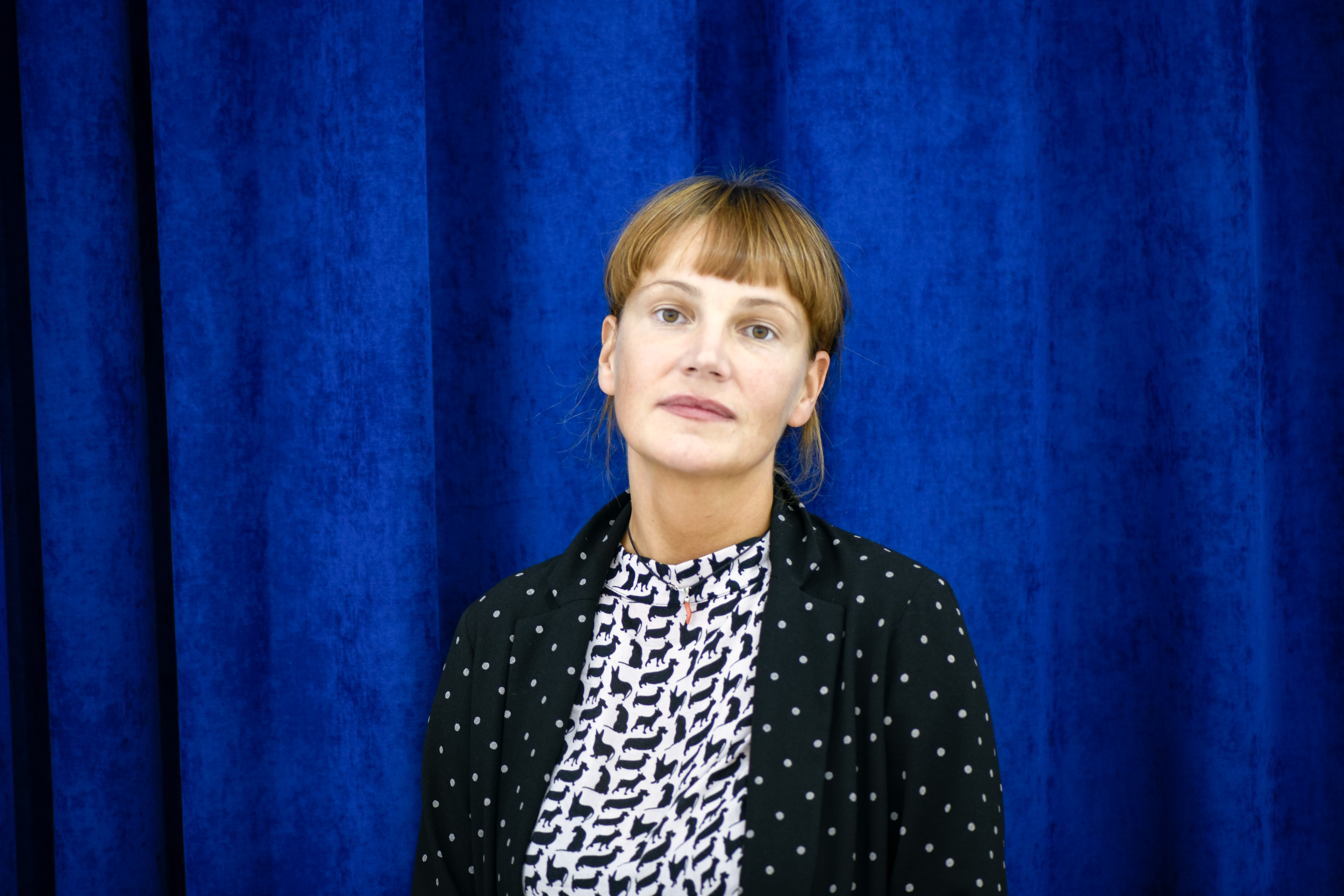
- Born: Petra Feriancová
- Known for: Photography, sculpture, installation
- Awards: Oscar Capan Award
- Website: petraferiancova.com

Petra Feriancová is a Slovak contemporary artist who works with photography, sculpture, and installation. Often working with archives of people closest to her and other materials, she interprets and re-organises them in a non-linear manner in the pursuit of finding alternative structures for how meaning and matter are constructed and perceived.

The key moment of her work is the conceptualization of her own emotional reactions to the processes of perception and memory as well as an examination of the circumstances under which they are shared. She works mostly with already existing images, texts which she interprets and methodically interchanges. The main aim of this form of manipulation with a pictorial or discursive reference is to provide the spectator with the original affective reaction. Each new realization leans towards a kind of implied connection between the universe of unique personal experience and the impersonal processes of individualization, which is conditioned by civilization, history and culture. Forms, images and vestiges of the fleeting past (family archives, repertoires of historical genres, symbols and discourses) are embraced even in the full awareness that their original meaning has long since degraded or disintegrated, proliferating those areas of indeterminacy which require – even if tentatively, by dint of improvising – being amended and filled with new meaning. Only then, even at the cost of the alienation and distortion of the "original" meaning, may one accept their own version of the world, and by doing so simultaneously open it to others. The process of the socialization or instrumentalization of the subjective, and at the same time, the purely personal interiorization of external contents – the process of mutual alienation as a condition for attributing and renewing meaning – is essentially present as a theme in each and every work by Petra Feriancová, in the form of minor epiphanies, glimpses of understanding, and revelations which cannot be transferred by simple explanation.

== Background ==
Feriancová was born in 1977 in Bratislava, Slovakia. She studied at the Accademia delle Belle Arti, Rome, Italy and Academy of Fine Arts and Design, Bratislava, Slovakia.

In 2010, she was the recipient of the Oscar Cepan Award for Young Fine Artists, presented by the FCS Civil Society Foundation. Feriancová represented Slovakia and the Czech Republic at the 55th Venice Biennale in 2013.

=== 2026 ===
Hydra's Heads, Gilda Lavia, Rome, IT

Antigone's Eyes, Fog gallery, Bratislava

Echo's Bones, Elizabeth Xi Bauer, Exmouth Market, London UK (curated by Maria do Carmo M. P. de Pontes, in collaboration with STROON/Dalibor Kocian and Zuzana Pastirčák Duchová)

Hands / Seclusions @Artefiera Bologna (for Gilda Lavia, curated by Marta Papini)

=== 2025 ===
The Fabric of Life, with Amanda Kyritsopoulou, Elizabeth Xi Bauer, London

2024

- Filtrating / Self-Renewal / Mimetic Body (with Roberta Zábojník), Old wastewater treatment plant, Prague, CZ

2023

- Eternity, Her Responsive Body and Other Stories, Palazzo Collicola, Spoleto, IT

2022

- Distraction/Élan/Vital/Echo/Alpha, Gilda Lavia, Rome, IT
- Porifera II, Tranzit.sk, Bratislava, SK
- Isolitudine, ZACentrale, Biennale Arcipelago Mediterraneo, Fondazione Merz, Turin, IT

2021

- Seclusion II, Aquapetra, Telese, IT
- Phylum: Porifera, Zahorian Van Espen, Prague, CZ
- Breeder: Kingdom Aves, Július Koller Society, Bratislava, SL

2020

- She Was Unaware of Her Borders./Ego Inhabitat, HDLU, Bacva Gallery, Mestrovic Pavilion, Zagreb, Croatia, HR
- Fabvlae, Santuario di Ercole Vincitore, Villa D'Este, Tivoli, IT

2019

- Lebenswelt, Significant Other, Vienna, AU

2018

- Klaviatura, Viltin Gallery, Budapest, HU
- Becoming Animal, with Nicolas Lamas, Tenderpixel, London, UK

2016

- Systems, Individuals and Measuring Tools, Bòlit Centre d'Art Contemporani, Girona, SP
- Survivals, Relics, Souvenire and Politics of Life, Apoteka, Dignano, Croatia
- An exhibition on doubt, Art Museum of the province of Nuoro, Nuoro, Sardinia, IT

2015

- Vulnerable yet everlasting, A Check Your Head! project, Viltin Gallery, Off Biennial, Budapest, HU

2014

- Things That Happen, And Things That Are Done. On Beginnings and Matter, Fondazione Morra Greco, Naples, IT

2011

- Theory of the City or the Possibilities of an A4, International Studio & Curatorial Program, New York, USA
- Postsriptum to Childe Harold's Pilgrimage, Slovak National Gallery, Bratislava, SK

=== Group ===
==== 2024 ====
- There's More to the Problem, Meta Spatiu, Timisoara, RO
- Extraction in Peratic Sanctuary, Medium gallery, Bratislava, SL

==== 2023 ====
- Lingua Franca, Bratislava City Gallery, Bratislava, SK
- Another Summer, Center for contemporary Arts, Kurzor, Prague, CZ

==== 2022 ====
- Janelas, Bibliothèque Jean Laude, Musée d'art moderne, Saint-Étienne, FR
- How To Deal With The World, Wilhelm Hallen, Berlin, DE
- Do Animals go to Heaven?, Chiesa del Purgatorio, Matera, IT

==== 2021 ====
- The Time Has Come to Talk of Many Things, The National gallery, Sofia BL
- Inventory of Forgotten Knowledge, Budapest Galéria, HU

==== 2020 ====
- Keeping In Balance, Works from Art Collection Telekom, Ludwig Museum, Budapest, HU

==== 2019 ====
- 30 years after, Art Collection Telekom, Carré d'Art, FR

==== 2018 ====
- 10, Viltin Gallery, Budapest, HU
- I Made A Line, SODA gallery, Bratislava, Slovakia, SK
- Useful Photography, Slovak National Gallery, Bratislava, SL
- I Am the Mouth, from Art Collection Telekom, Museum of Contemporary Art Zagreb, Croatia

==== 2017 ====
- Utopian Display: Props and Tools, FM Centro per l'arte contemporanea, Milan, IT
- Revolving Truth, Symposium, Królikarnia, Warsaw, PL

== Selected Bibliography and publications ==
- 2019: Petra Feriancová: Vol.IV Species, ISBN 978-8089894123
- 2019: Petra Feriancová: Vol. III, Genus, ISBN 978-80-89894-13-0
- 2019: Petra Feriancová: Vol. II Class, ISBN 978-80-89894-09-3
- 2013: Petra Feriancová, Index, An Order of Things I, Mousse publishing ISBN 978-88-6749-052-3
