= Matthew Buckingham =

American filmmaker

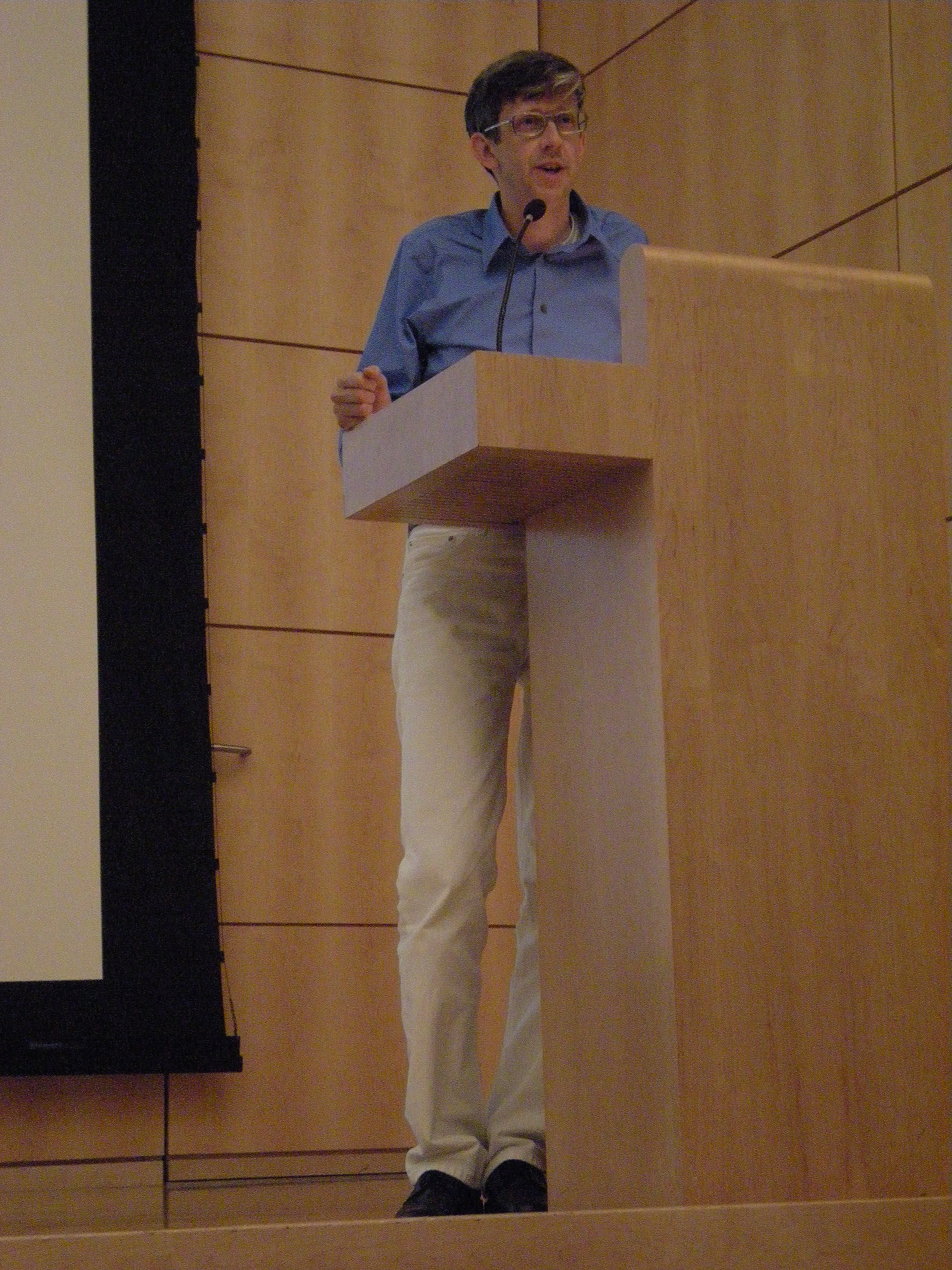
- Buckingham speaking at the Henry Art Gallery, Seattle, Washington
- Born: 1963 (age 62–63)
- Known for: Film, video, photography, and installation art
- Awards: DAAD Artist in Berlin Fellowship (2003)
- Website: matthewbuckingham.net

Matthew Buckingham (born 1963) is an American filmmaker and multimedia artist.

He is a full-time faculty member at Columbia University and is the chair of the visual arts department.

== Life and work ==
Buckingham studied at the Art Institute of Chicago, the University of Iowa, Bard College, and the Whitney Museum's Independent Study Program.

Utilizing photography, film, video, audio, writing, and drawing his work questions the role that social memory plays in contemporary life. By examining ways that the past appears in the present, Buckingham also scrutinizes the power and effects of historical representation. His projects work with space, real and imaginary, to create physical and social contexts where viewers are encouraged to question received ideas—often the things that are most familiar. His works have investigated the Indigenous past and present in the Hudson River Valley; the ‘creative destruction’ of the city of St. Louis; the inception of the first English dictionary and the effects of radical Mary Wollstonecraft’s thoughts in our own time.

He is also a full-time faculty member at Columbia University and is the chair of the visual arts department.

== Publications ==
- Canal Street Canal
- Everything I Need
- False Future
- Improbable Horse
- A Man of the Crowd
- Messages from the Unseen
- Narratives
- One Side of Broadway
- Play the Story
- Sandra of the Tulip House or How to Live in a Free State
- The Six Grandfathers from the Cretaceous Period to the Present
- The Spirit and the Letter
- Subcutaneous
- Amos Fortune Road

== Exhibitions ==
He has had solo exhibitions at the Brooklyn Museum, New York; Glassel School of Art, Museum of Fine Arts, Houston; Museo Nacional Centro de Arte Reina Sofia, Madrid; Museum of Contemporary Art, Denver; Camden Arts Centre, London; Charles H. Scott Gallery, Vancouver; Dallas Museum of Art, Dallas; Des Moines Arts Center, Des Moines; Dundee Contemporary Arts, Dundee; FRAC Bourgogne, Dijon; Henry Art Gallery, Seattle; Fundacion Telefónica, Madrid; Hamburger Bahnhof, National Gallery, Berlin; Lunds Konsthall, Lund; Midway Contemporary Art, Minneapolis; Moderna Museet, Stockholm; Museum Moderner Kunst, Vienna; P.S.1 Contemporary Art Center, New York; St. Louis Museum of Art, St. Louis; Statens Museum for Kunst, Copenhagen; The Kitchen, New York; Westfälischer Kunstverein, Münster; Kunstmuseum St. Gallen. He participated in the 2006 Liverpool Biennial and the Third Guangzhou Triennial in 2008.

In the fall of 2019, Buckingham was included in the group exhibition "Ancient History of the Distant Future" at the Pennsylvania Academy of the Fine Arts (PAFA). Buckingham exhibited a work entitled, “The Six Grandfathers, Paha Sapa, in the Year 502,002 C.E.,” a digital print showing an eroded Mount Rushmore and a timeline of the mountain back to 66,000,000 B.C.E.

== Awards ==
He was a guest of the DAAD Artist-in-Berlin Program, 2003; recipient of the Freund Fellowship, Washington University in St. Louis, 2004; Artist-in-Residence at The University of Wisconsin at Madison, 2006; resident of the IASPIS program, Stockholm, 2007; Artist-in-Residence at Artpace, San Antonio, 2007 and recipient of a Louis Comfort Tiffany Foundation award, 2009. He has also received fellowships and awards from The New York State Council on the Arts and The New York Foundation for the Arts.
