= 3D stereo view =

Enables viewing of objects through any stereo pattern

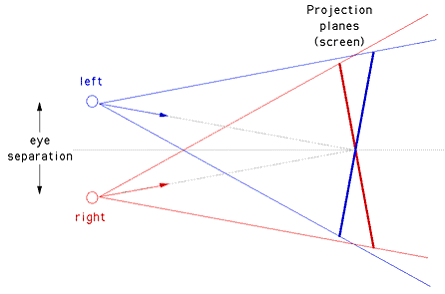
stereo view

A 3D stereo view is the viewing of objects through any stereo pattern.

== History ==
In 1833, an English scientist Charles Wheatstone discovered stereopsis, the component of depth perception that arises due to binocular disparity. Binocular disparity comes from the human eyes having a distance between them: A 3D scene viewed through the left eye creates a slightly different image than the same scene viewed with the right eye, with the head kept in the same position. Five years later, according to what he discovered, he invented the stereoscope.

A stereoscope is a binocular device through which a pair of monocular images was projected to both eyes in such a way that the optic axes converge at the same angle, which gives the impression of a 3D image. Since then, people have begun to understand the concept of stereo view. Wheatstone's invention was impractical until Sir David Brewster, a Scottish physicist and experimenter of optics, discovered that a 3D effect could be observed in repeated patterns with small difference in 1844. Brewster used what he discovered in building the stereo camera. The stereo camera combined the refracting stereoscope with two separate cameras which were placed slightly apart. The monocular pictures through the cameras gave the resulting image a 3D effect.

In 1846, W Rollman invented 3D anaglyphs, which are two sets of superimposed identical line drawing (one in blue and the other in red), which when viewed through red and blue glasses, appeared to be three-dimensional. And then in 1891, Louis Ducas du Haron created the first printed anaglyphs-photographs consisting of two negatives (one in blue or green, the other in red) printed on the same sheet of paper to form a stereoscopic photograph.

In 1930s, inventor Edwin Land replaced the red and green filters in the du Haron's anaglyphs with two planes of polarised light.

In 1959, Dr. Bela Julesz, a psychologist researching on depth perception and pattern recognition, created random-dot stereo images, which are pictures consisting of a uniform, random distribution of dots.

== Autostereogram viewing techniques ==
If one has two eyes, fairly healthy eyesight, and no neurological conditions which prevent the perception of depth, then one is capable of learning to see the images within autostereograms. "Like learning to ride a bicycle or to swim, some pick it up immediately, while others have a harder time."

Most autostereograms are designed for divergent (wall-eyed) viewing. One way to help the brain concentrate on divergence instead of focusing is to hold the picture in front of the face, with the nose touching the picture. With intense lighting, the eye can constrict the pupil, yet allow enough light to reach the retina. The more the eye resembles a pinhole camera, the less it depends on focusing through the lens. In other words, the degree of decoupling between focusing and convergence needed to visualize an autostereogram is reduced. This places less strain on the brain. Therefore, it may be easier for first-time autostereogram viewers to "see" their first 3D images if they attempt this feat with bright lighting.

Another way is to stare at an object behind the picture in an attempt to establish proper divergence, while keeping part of the eyesight fixed on the picture to convince the brain to focus on the picture. A modified method has the viewer focus on their reflection on a reflective surface of the picture, which the brain perceives as being located twice as far away as the picture itself. This may help persuade the brain to adopt the required divergence while focusing on the nearby picture.

For crossed-eyed autostereograms, a different approach needs to be taken. The viewer may hold one finger between their eyes and move it slowly towards the picture, maintaining focus on the finger at all times, until they are correctly focused on the spot that will allow them to view the illusion.

== Implementation ==
1. 3D film. A 3D or 3-D (three-dimensional) film or S3D (stereoscopic 3D) film is a motion picture that enhances the depth cues seen by the viewer. The most common approach to the production of 3D films is derived from stereoscopic photography. In it, a regular motion picture camera system is used to record the images as seen from two perspectives (or computer-generated imagery generates the two perspectives in post-production), and special projection hardware and/or eyewear are used to provide the illusion of depth when viewing the film. Some methods of producing 3D films do not require the use of two images. 3D films are not limited to feature film theatrical releases; television broadcasts and direct-to-video films have also incorporated similar methods, especially since the advent of 3D television and Blu-ray 3D.

3D films have existed in some form since 1915, but had been largely relegated to a niche in the motion picture industry because of the costly hardware and processes required to produce and display a 3D film, and the lack of a standardized format for all segments of the entertainment business. Nonetheless, 3D films were prominently featured in the 1950s in American cinema, and later experienced a worldwide resurgence in the 1980s and 1990s driven by IMAX high-end theaters and Disney themed-venues. 3D films became more and more successful throughout the 2000s, culminating in the unprecedented success of 3D presentations of Avatar in December 2009 and January 2010.

2. Machine vision Machine vision (MV) is the technology and methods used to provide imaging-based automatic inspection and analysis for such applications as automatic inspection, process control, and robot guidance in industry. The scope of MV is broad. MV is related to, though distinct from, computer vision.

3. Three dimensional art Three-dimensional art is observed in terms of its height, width and depth. It is not flat like two-dimensional art, which consists of paintings, drawings and photographs. Pottery and sculpture are examples of three-dimensional art.

Form is the three-dimensional artwork. Forms can be geometric or organic. Three-dimensional art has volume, which is the amount of space occupied by the form. The form also has mass, which means that the volume is solid and occupies space.

Three-dimensional art design consists of three main elements: balance, proportion and rhythm. Balance denotes visual balance, not the actual ability to stand upright. Proportion refers to the various parts of the three-dimensional object. The parts need to give the appearance of belonging together. Rhythm is the repetition of line or shape within the overall form.

4. Autostereoscopy Autostereoscopy is any method of displaying stereoscopic images (adding binocular perception of 3D depth) without the use of special headgear or glasses on the part of the viewer. Because headgear is not required, it is also called "glasses-free 3D" or "glassesless 3D". There are two broad approaches currently used to accommodate motion parallax and wider viewing angles: eye-tracking, and multiple views so that the display does not need to sense where the viewers' eyes are located.

Examples of autostereoscopic displays technology include lenticular lens, parallax barrier, volumetric display, holographic and light field displays.

== See also ==
- Autostereogram
- Stereoscopy
- Random dot stereogram
- Stereo display
- Stereophotogrammetry
- Stereo camera
- Three-dimensional space
