= SeeReal Technologies =

SeeReal Technologies GmbH
- Company type: LLC (GmbH)
- Industry: Electronics, Volumetric display technologies
- Founded: 2002
- Defunct: 2024
- Fate: Out of Business
- Headquarters: Dresden, Germany
- Products: Holographic and Autostereoscopic Displays
- Number of employees: > 30 (2023)

SeeReal Technologies GmbH is a Dresden-based company focusing on the development of 3D displays. It is owned by its Luxembourg parent company SeeReal Technologies S.A., which is responsible for marketing, partnering and IP licensing.

The firm was founded in 2002 by Dr. Armin Schwerdtner, who had previously headed an optics research group at the Dresden University of Technology (TU Dresden).

SeeReal develops technology that is licensed to display manufacturers, including several variants of a tracked autostereoscopic display.

The firm has presented a real-time desktop holographic display on the SID 2007 Display Week in Long Beach (California) and the FPD 2007 in Yokohama (Japan). The firm owns more than 100 patents in the field of holographic and autostereoscopic 3D displays.

SeeReal was awarded the European Information Society Technologies Prize (IST), and the Innovation Prize of the Free State of Saxony in 2007.

SeeReal, as of 2024, is out of business, and the website ceased functioning.
