= Z800 =

Z800 may refer to:

- Kawasaki Z800 - a motorcycle
- Sony Ericsson Z800i - a mobile phone model
- Zilog Z800 - a 16-bit microprocessor designed by Zilog
- Z800 3DVisor - a head-mounted display manufactured by eMagin
- Verizon Wireless Z800 - a CDMA cellphone manufactured by Sharp
- Z800 - Hewlett-Packard Z-series dual CPU Intel-based workstation
