= Zebra Imaging =

- Company type: Privately held company
- Founded: 1996
- Founders: Michael Klug, Mark Holzbach and Alejandro Ferdman
- Headquarters: Austin, TX, USA
- Key people: Chuck Scullion, CEO & Chairman; Chris Yeoman, CFO
- Products: 3D digital holographic images. Motion-capable 3D display technology. Holographic Imagers
- Website: www.zebraimaging.com

Zebra Imaging was a company that developed 3D digital holographic images, hologram imagers and interactive 3D displays for government and commercial uses. The company offers digital holograms that are autostereoscopic (no glasses or goggles required), full-parallax (viewing of the image from viewpoints above and below as well as from side to side) and in monochrome or full-color. They have also developed a 3D Dynamic Display, which is capable of rendering holograms in real time; design work with 3D programs such as SketchUp and 123D Catch can be viewed on a holographic display while they are actively being edited.

== History ==
Zebra Imaging was founded in 1996 by graduates of the Massachusetts Institute of Technology’s Media Laboratory. Its technology was based in-part on work done at the MIT Media Laboratory’s Spatial Imaging Group under the direction of the late holography pioneer, Prof. Stephen Benton.

In 2017, Zebra Imaging announced the sale of its 3D Holographic Print Assets to HoloTech Switzerland AG.

== Technology ==
The company has been granted over 40 patents with others pending in the U.S. and abroad. Zebra Imaging's 3D digital holographic technology presents multiple perspectives of an image simultaneously and independently to all viewers. The imagery in the static holograms can be subdivided into channels to show short animations or peel-away and overlay views. Since 2005, Zebra Imaging has been developing dynamic (motion-capable) 3D display technology, supported in-part by DARPA (Defense Advanced Research Projects Agency). In November 2011 Zebra's dynamic ZScape display was selected among Time Magazine's "50 Most Important Inventions of 2011."

== Funding ==
In 2006, it completed a $5.9 million Series C round of funding led by Voyager Capital.

In 2013, the company raised $3.9 million financing collected from 11 investors.

== See also ==
- Digital holography
- Hogel
- Holography
- List of companies based in Austin, Texas
- MIT Media Lab
- Volumetric display

== Notes ==
- Zebra Imaging products at NVIDIA GTC 2009 captured on YouTube.
- Zebra Imaging affect of holograms on the auto design industry.
- Zebra Imaging use of NVIDIA GPUs.
