= Volumetric printing =

Volumetric printing is a three-dimensional digital-to-physical imaging technology developed in 2013 that uses ink or other pigments suspended in a volume to form a full-color volumetric scene in physical space. It is a static version of volumetric display. Volumetric prints are auto-stereoscopic, full parallax (in both horizontal and vertical viewing arrangements) and can be viewed by multiple viewers in regular room lighting.

A volumetric print can be thought of as a reconstructed light field based on the scattering of light by distributed pigments in volume. Any three-dimensional scene can be volumetrically printed, although biological specimens and volumetrically X-rayed objects (i.e., CT scans) are thought to be particularly well suited to this type of imaging.

== Procedure ==
There are several methods for producing a volumetric print, the most common being an index-matched stack of hundreds of sheets of thin clear material (most often PMMA, also known as Lucite or acrylic). Each sheet in the volumetric stack is printed with a color slice of a digital 3D model, placed in a vacuum chamber, and then injected with a fluid matching the index of refraction of the sheet material.

Volumetric printing has been called "Hologram 2.0" by a company marketing the technology. Volumetric prints however are not produced in the same manner as holograms, in that there is no interference pattern generated or used in basic volumetric prints.

== See also ==
- Swarm 3D printing
