= VHD =

VHD may refer to:

- Viral haemorrhagic disease (VHD), another name for rabbit haemorrhagic disease
- Valvular heart disease, involving one or more of the four valves of the heart
- Verband der Historiker und Historikerinnen Deutschlands, a German association of historians
- VHD (file format), used by Microsoft for OS virtualization
- Video High Density, a videodisc format
- Volumetric haptic display, a device that presents a 3-dimensional touch-based image
- Vehicle-hours of delay, a measure of traffic congestion
- Vampire Hunter D, an ongoing novel series since 1983.
