= LG Optimus 3D =

Android smartphone developed by LG Electronics

LG Optimus 3D P920 LG Thrill 4G

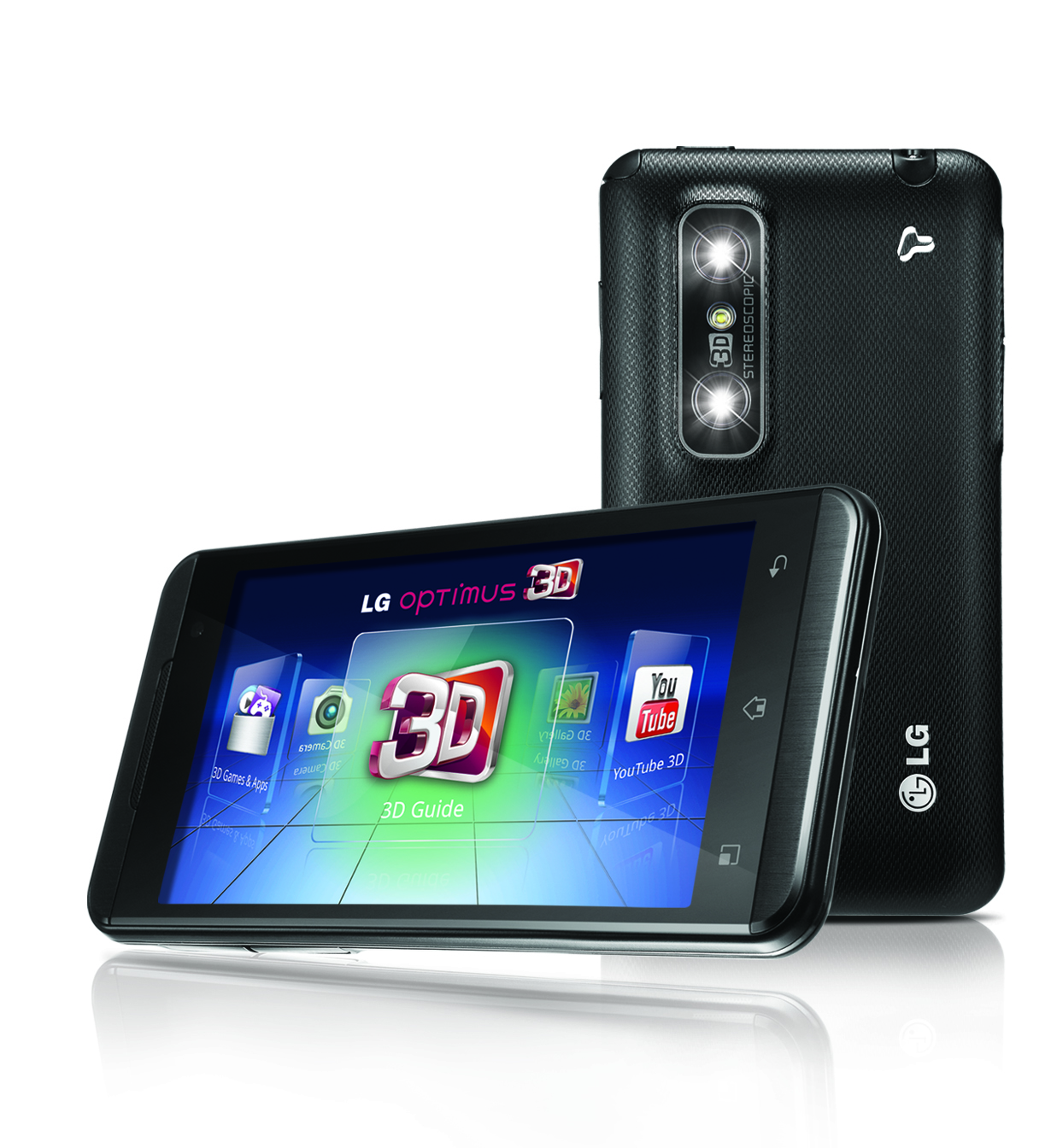
- Manufacturer: LG Electronics
- Type: Smartphone
- Series: Optimus
- Availability by region: 7 July 2011
- Predecessor: LG Optimus 2X
- Successor: LG Optimus 3D Max
- Related: HTC Evo 3D; LG Revolution; LG Optimus LTE
- Form factor: Slate
- Dimensions: 127 mm (5.0 in) H 66 mm (2.6 in) W 12 mm (0.47 in) D
- Weight: 170 g (6.0 oz)
- Operating system: Android 2.2 Froyo (upgradeable to 2.3 Gingerbread 4.0 Ice Cream Sandwich, and 4.1.2 Jellybean)
- CPU: 1 GHz dual-core ARM Cortex-A9 SoC processor; TI OMAP4430
- GPU: PowerVR SGX540 @ 304 MHz
- Memory: 512 MB RAM
- Storage: 8 GB on board eMMC
- Removable storage: Micro-SDHC (32 GB max)
- Battery: 1500 mAh Lithium-ion battery
- Rear camera: Backside Illumination Dual 5 megapixel stereo cameras with autofocus
- Front camera: VGA (0.3 MP)
- Display: 800×480 px, 4.3 in (10.9 cm) at 217 ppi WVGA TFT LCD Autostereoscopic 3D-capable (glasses-free)
- Connectivity: tri-band CDMA/EVDO Rev. A (800/800Bluetooth v3.0 + HS; Micro USB; HDMI (via MHL)
- Data inputs: Multi-touch touchscreen display 3-axis accelerometer 3-axis gyroscope Digital compass Proximity sensor Ambient light sensor
- Other: Wi-Fi Hotspot, A-GPS, FM-radio

The LG Optimus 3D (marketed as the LG Thrill 4G in the USA) is a touchscreen smartphone from LG Electronics, announced at Mobile World Congress on 12 February 2011. It was notable for being the first mobile phone to feature a glasses-free 3D (stereoscopic) display.

LG Optimus 3D runs Android 2.2 Froyo and is upgradable to Android 4.0 Ice Cream Sandwich. It was released on 7 July 2011 in the UK and advertised as the world's first full 3D mobile phone. It has 512 MB of RAM and 8 GB of onboard storage, which can be expanded by up to 32 GB using a micro SDHC card. The phone features two 5 MP back-facing cameras that are capable of filming 720p 3D and Full HD 1080p in 2D, while pictures taken in 2D mode are 5 MP and 3 MP when taking a 3D picture. It also includes a VGA front-facing camera for video-calling. The phone features a 3D user interface which allows the users to access 3D content, such as YouTube in 3D, 3D games and apps, or 3D gallery with a push of a button.

== Tri-dual technology ==
The LG Optimus 3D showcases LG's "tri-dual" technology: dual-core, dual-channel and dual-memory. It receives significant performance benefits as a result of the faster transfer of data between the dual-core and dual-memory. This enables users to browse web pages, multitask between computer programs, play games at a higher frame rate and enjoy movies more smoothly.

== 3D hot key ==
Along with a range of other features, the LG Optimus 3D also provides a 3D Hot Key for instant access to the dedicated 3D menus. It allows users to switch from 3D to 2D, or 2D to 3D. With the latest Gingerbread update, the 3D Hot Key can be used as a camera shutter for taking pictures conveniently.

== 3D applications ==
The LG Optimus 3D comes with a range of different 3D applications, ranging from the latest games to a 3D Gallery. Unlike its competitor the Evo 3D, it has a 3D user interface which enables users to navigate through the features in 3D.

The glasses-free 3D effect is generated by a parallax barrier screen.

On 15 November 2011, LG announced an enhanced version of Gingerbread customized for the Optimus 3D. LG claims it enriches the 3D experience and adds the ability to do 3D video editing.

== Content sharing ==
The LG Optimus 3D is capable of sharing and viewing 3D videos on the large screen, with an HDMI 1.4 connection to 3D equipped TVs or monitors and with DLNA certified-compatible products. This allows users to show their own captured 3D content in the widescreen.

== Features ==
- Android™ 2.2 Froyo, upgradeable to 4.0 Ice Cream Sandwich or 4.1.2 Jellybean
- 4.3 inch 480 x 800 Glasses free 3D display
- 1 GHz dual-core processor (Texas Instruments OMAP4 Processor Chip set)
- Front-facing camera for video-calling
- GPS Navigation
- Stereo Bluetooth wireless technology
- microSD Card slot, 32-GB-capable
- 8 GB internal memory and 512MB RAM
- Media player with 3.5 mm headset jack and micro USB
- Proximity, G-Sensor and light sensors
- Digital compass
- A few of 3D-games pre-installed
- 3D user interface
- Switch between 3D and 2D easily
- HDMI-out via separate port, Micro-HDMI (Type D)
- HD video capture at 1080p in 2D and 720p in 3D
- YouTube 3D

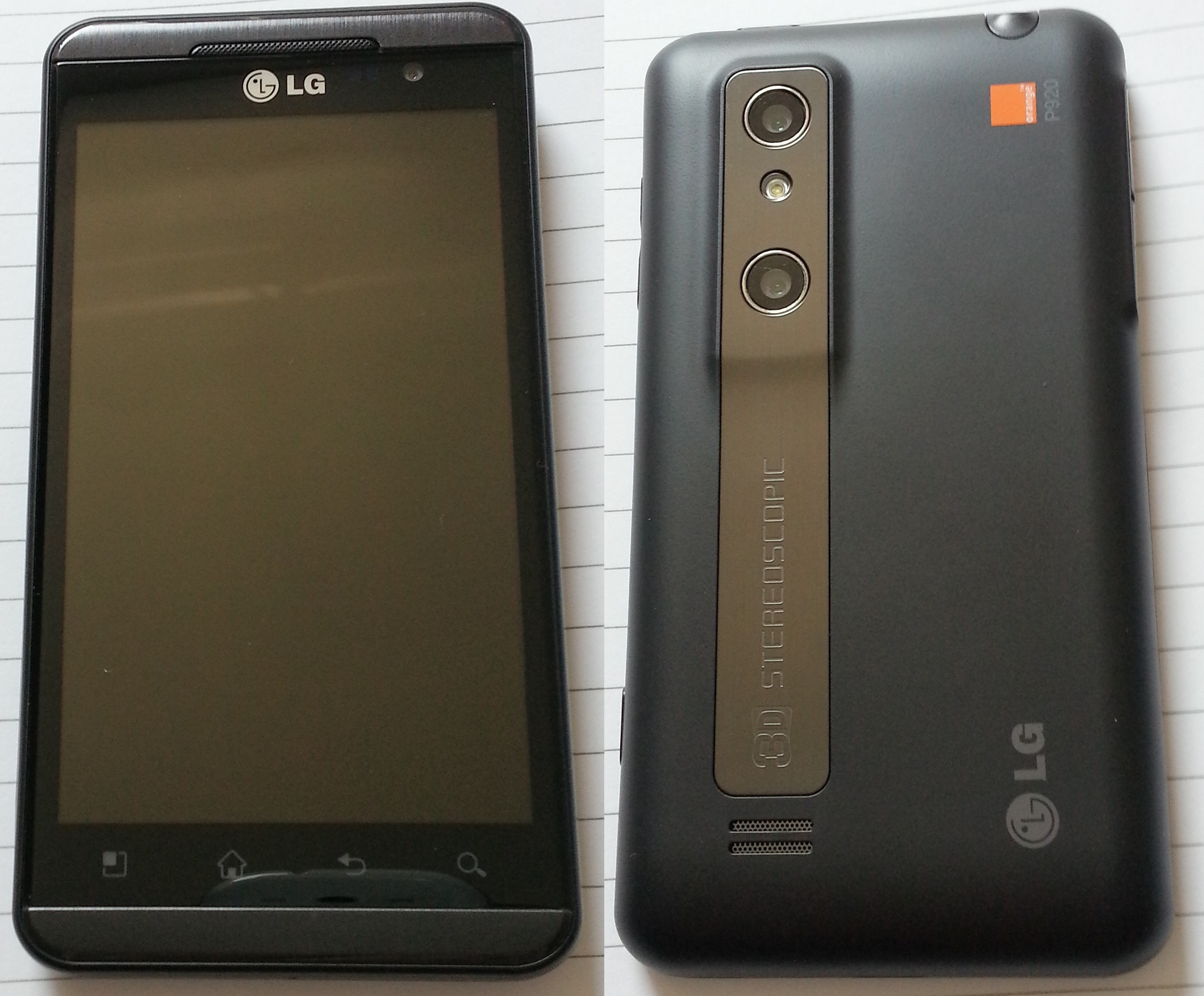
An LG Optimus 3D

== Reception ==
Reviewers praised the phone's 3D effects, but criticized the use of Android Froyo, when phones running Android Gingerbread were currently on the market.

TechRadar rated the phone 3½ out of 5 stars, while PhoneArena rated it an 8.0 out of 10.0.

== Similar handsets ==
The LG Optimus 3D is a direct competitor of the HTC Evo 3D which also has 3D capabilities, although the latter only allows for 2 MP in 3D recording mode, as opposed to 3 MP for the LG handset.

The LG Revolution features similar specifications, excluding a dual-core CPU, a 3D screen, hot key, and camera, but having 4G LTE capability, larger internal memory, and on Verizon's network.

LG announced a successor, the LG Optimus 3D Max, at Mobile World Congress, along with the Optimus 4X HD and the Optimus Vu. Due to a new 3-D converter, the 3D Max offers a better 3D experience than its predecessor. With 9.6 mm thickness and 148 grams weight, the model is about two millimeters thinner and 20 grams lighter than its predecessor. 2D images from Google Earth and Google Maps can be transformed into 3D images. A button on the side of the phone allows the user to switch between 2D and 3D view. In April 2012, the LG Optimus 3D Max also came onto the market in Europe.

== See also ==
- Galaxy Nexus
- List of Android smartphones
- List of 3D-enabled mobile phones
