= EMagin =

Electronic components manufacturer

eMagin
- Traded as: NYSE: EMAN
- Industry: Semiconductor Equipment & Materials
- Founded: 1996
- Headquarters: Hopewell Junction, New York
- Key people: Andrew G. Sculley Jr. ( Chief Exec. Officer, Pres, and Director) (2012.12)
- Products: OLED microdisplays related products
- Parent: Samsung Display
- Website: www.emagin.com

eMagin Corporation is an American electronic components manufacturer based in Hopewell Junction, New York. eMagin specializes in organic light emitting diode (OLED) technology and manufactures micro OLED display used in virtual imaging products and other related products.

Since the company's founding in 1996 it has developed and manufactured products for other various markets, including medical, law enforcement, remote presence, industrial, computer interface, gaming and entertainment. For its microdisplays being incorporated in various military equipment such as night vision goggle and head-mounted display systems, the company has been a contractor to the U.S. military.

In 2000, eMagin Corporation was named the winner of 2000 SID Information Display Magazine Display of the Year Gold Award, for technological advancement in the development of the organic light emitting diode (OLED) microdisplay technology, referred to as OLED-on-silicon.

In October 2023, the company was acquired by Samsung Display in an all-cash deal worth approximately US$218 million and its stock was delisted from the NYSE American.

== Z800 3DVisor ==
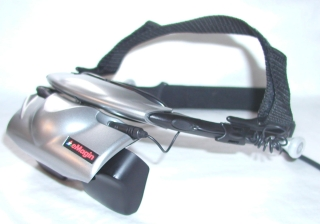
the Z800 3DVisor

The Z800 3DVisor is a head-mounted display manufactured by eMagin since 2005.

The main part of the Z800 is a pair of OLED displays with magnifying lenses producing a 40-degree diagonal field of view for each eye, used to display stereoscopic images with a fixed resolution of 800x600 pixels, through the use of the nVidia stereoscopic 3D drivers, or, using later firmware revisions, any source of alternating frames. The visor can also be used as a 2D portable monitor on computers not equipped with an nVidia video card, using another operating system, or Macintoshes.

The visor is equipped with a NEC TOKIN combined accelerometer/magnetometer/rate gyroscope 3-degrees of freedom motion sensor used to emulate mouse movements (typically to look around in first-person shooters), a pair of ear buds and an integrated microphone.

== See also ==
- Virtual reality
- 3D stereo view
