= Sharp Actius RD3D =

The Sharp Actius RD3D was a 3D laptop computer manufactured by the Sharp Corporation in 2004. The company marketed it as the first "autostereo" PC, offering 3D images without glasses.

== Features ==
It had a built-in 3D graphics button that would create a 3D image by using a "parallax barrier", which beamed two different images to each eye, confusing the brain into thinking that the user was looking at a 3D image, all without the use of 3D glasses.

== Problems ==
Common problems with the Sharp Actius RD3D were:

- The 3D graphics could reportedly not be seen if the user slightly shifted position while looking at the computer.
- The computer's performance reportedly slowed when it was put into 3D mode.
- It was also very big (12 pounds), bulky, and extremely expensive, selling for $2,999.
- The battery life was also inferior, reportedly lasting for a mere 2 hours.

The product was featured in the "25 Worst Tech Products of All Time" list published by PC World magazine in 2006.
