= Red Hydrogen One =

Android smartphone from Red Digital Cinema featuring a "4V" 3D display

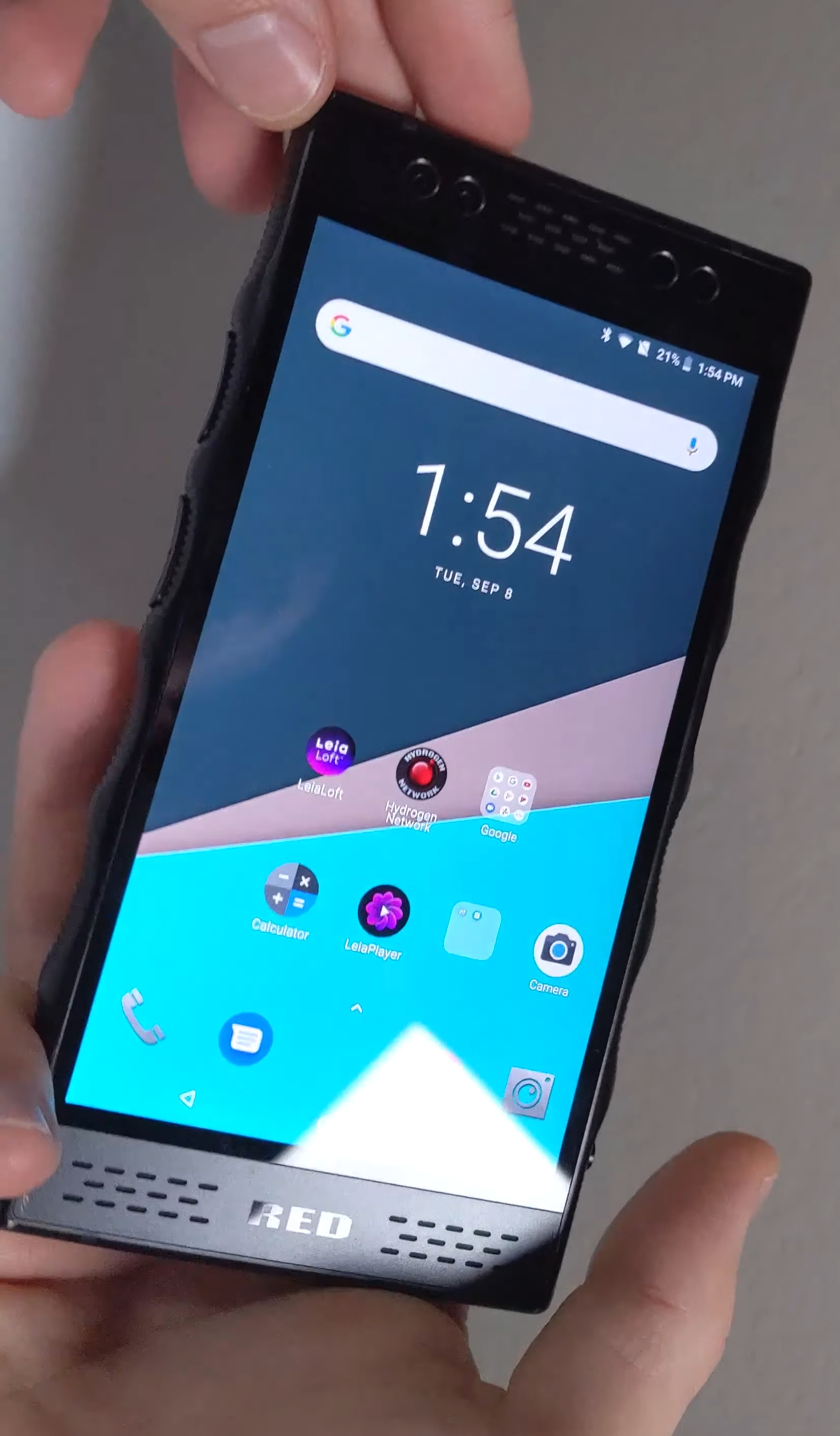

The Red Hydrogen One is a discontinued Android smartphone manufactured by Red Digital Cinema. It was announced on May 18, 2018, and released in the United States via AT&T and Verizon Wireless on November 2, 2018, after multiple delays.

The Hydrogen One's signature features revolve around imaging, including a 3D display (called 4-View or 4V) that uses diffracted backlighting to create depth effects, dual front and rear cameras that can take pictures and film video in the device's proprietary 3D format as well as standard 3D SBS and 2D, and pin connectors that were meant to allow the device to be integrated into other planned products (such as a 3D 8K camera called Red Lithium that was to use the Hydrogen One as a viewfinder).

It was discontinued in October 2019, after which Red exited the smartphone market.

== Specifications ==
=== Hardware ===
The Hydrogen One's design is influenced by the lens mounts of Red's cinema cameras, with aluminum and Kevlar materials. scalloped grips, and texturing; hardware buttons and a fingerprint reader are integrated into some of the scallops. It features a 5.7-inch 1440p LCD with 3D display technology branded as "4V" ("4 View"). Developed by the Red-backed startup Leia, it uses nanostructures to diffract the display's backlight into a light field, creating a "holographic" depth effect.

The device features dual 8-megapixel front-facing and 16-megapixel rear-facing cameras, which can also be used to take holographic photos and video compatible with 4V. The front-facing cameras only support 4V in portrait orientation, and the rear-facing cameras only support 4V in landscape. There are expansion pins on the rear of the Hydrogen One for integration with other hardware. Red unveiled an 8K professional camera in partnership with Lucid, which supports 4V and could use a Hydrogen One as a 3D viewfinder. However, references to these products have since been removed from Red's website, citing planned "changes" to the Hydrogen program. It utilizes the Qualcomm Snapdragon 835 system-on-chip, with 6 GB of RAM, 128 GB of expandable storage, and a 4500 mAH battery.

=== Software ===
The Hydrogen One ships with Android 8.1 "Oreo", and is bundled with several applications intended to showcase 4V-compatible content, including Red Player, the LeiaLoft app store for apps and games, Hydrogen Network for movies and shorts (which also includes film rentals), and the photo sharing social network app Holopix. 4V content is currently proprietary to the Hydrogen One and can only be viewed through the supplied apps, but Red Player can also play back standard 3D formats which can also be uploaded to Holopix. Red stated that the device would receive ongoing updates to improve its functionality and software. The AT&T version is provided with 3D digital copies of Fantastic Beasts and Where to Find Them and Ready Player One.

== Reception ==
The Hydrogen One received mixed reviews. Its utilitarian design was considered to be a contrast to other mainstream smartphones, but that it also made the device large and heavy (however, CNET felt that this design made the Hydrogen One "satisfyingly dense and solid"). CNET felt that the display's holographic effect was "oddly reminiscent of lenticular printed 3D baseball cards", and observed mixed reactions from colleagues who were shown demonstrations. The Verge felt that the 4V display's depth effect was akin to "a paper cutout being placed on top of a flat background" that "creates some illusion of depth, but [is] very clearly artificial in most cases", and that the display seemed "smudged" when the 3D mode was activated. 4V video was criticized for "[tending] to flicker in and out and have lots of strange artifacts", and being "dizzying anytime there’s too much motion and the layers of depth are constantly changing". The limited amount of 4V content, and the quality of their effects, was also noted.

In regards to its cameras, CNET described their image quality as being akin to "analog film", with 2D images showing realistic color reproduction (as opposed to the processed output of competitors such as Google Pixel 3 and iPhone XS) and detail, but that they struggled in low-light conditions, as well as medium-to-low-light video (a trait considered contradictory to Red's reputation as a professional video camera manufacturer). The Verge felt that 4V photos of people "generally end up looking really goofy, with the person appearing as a paper cutout on top of whatever was behind them". The quality of its Android software was also noted, as well as its use of the older Snapdragon 835 over the newer and faster 845.

With a score of 7.9 out of 10, CNET concluded that the Hydrogen One needed polish, but "has a flagship price and flagship ambitions." In contrast, The Verge gave the Hydrogen One a score of 3 out of 10, arguing that it "fell short" of the quality expected among phones in its price range, and acknowledging the shortcomings of the features that were intended to set the Hydrogen One apart from them.
