= Leia (company) =

Leia Inc.
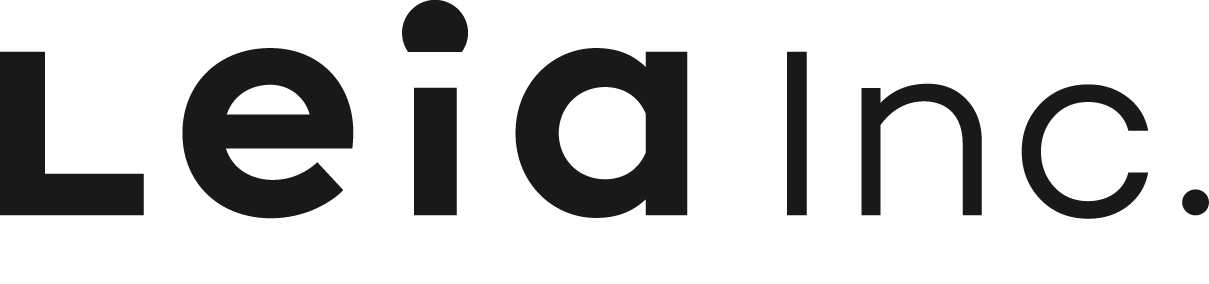
- Company type: Private
- Industry: Display technology
- Founded: 2014
- Founder: David Fattal, Pierre-Emmanuel Evreux, Zhen Peng
- Headquarters: Menlo Park, California, United States
- Website: www.leiainc.com

Leia Inc. is an American company producing 3D autostereoscopic displays and software applications.

Leia is headquartered in Menlo Park, California, with a nano-fabrication center in Palo Alto, a content team in Los Angeles and Auckland, New Zealand, and industrialization center in Suzhou, China.

== History ==
The company was founded in 2014 as a spin-off of HP Labs. Its research into the holographic display concept under HP was published by Nature in 2013. CEO David Fattal explained the diffraction-based system was intended to address shortcomings certain limitations of other mobile three-dimensional display approaches including support for multiple simultaneous viewers, the ability to operate in a conventional two-dimensional mode without loss of resolution, and reduced reliance on computational eye-tracking. The company foresaw uses of its technology in mobile devices, automobiles, and medical applications.

In May 2016, Leia announced a partnership with Altice to market a smartphone featuring its technology.

In 2017, Red Digital Cinema announced its intent to produce a high-end smartphone featuring the technology (the Red Hydrogen One). As part of its development, Red entered into a partnership with Leia, including funding, and Red's founder Jim Jannard joining Leia's board of directors.

In 2018, Leia launched its 3D content platform LeiaLoft™ including an Android App Store and a developer portal.

The Red Hydrogen device, which used Leia’s autostereoscopic display, was released in the United States on 2 November 2018 through carriers including AT&T and Verizon, and was later offered in Mexico through Telcel.
