= Sony Ericsson V800 =

Mobile phone manufactured by Sony Ericsson

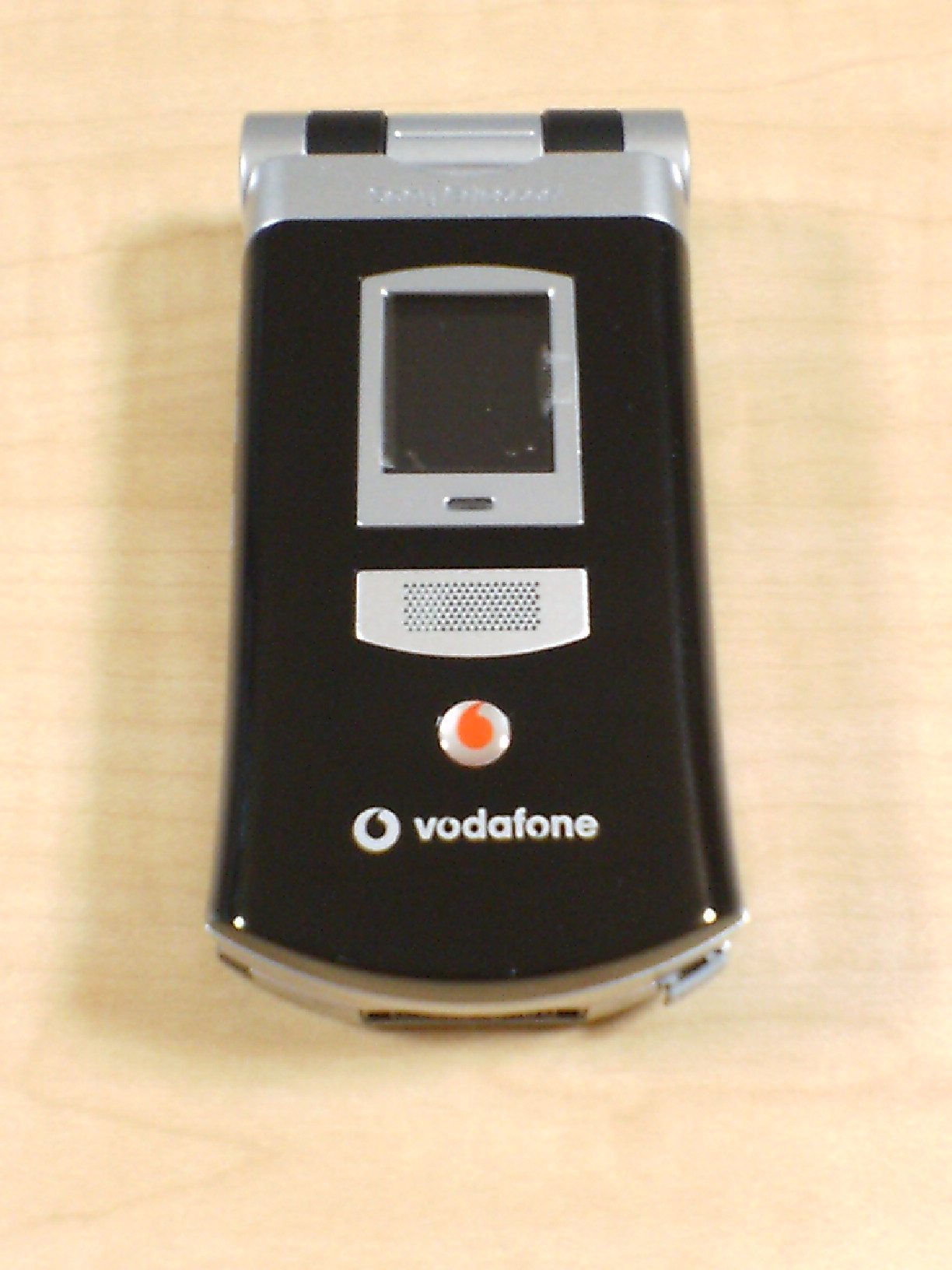
- Compatible networks: GPRS/GSM 900/1800/1900 MHz, UMTS
- Form factor: clamshell
- Dimensions: 102×49×24 mm (4.02×1.93×0.94 in)
- Weight: 128 g
- Memory: 7 MB
- Removable storage: Memory Stick Pro Duo
- Rear camera: 1.3 Mpx
- Display: 36 × 45 mm, 176 × 220 px; 262,000-color TFT
- External display: 12 × 21 mm, 80 × 101 px
- Connectivity: USB, Bluetooth, Infrared

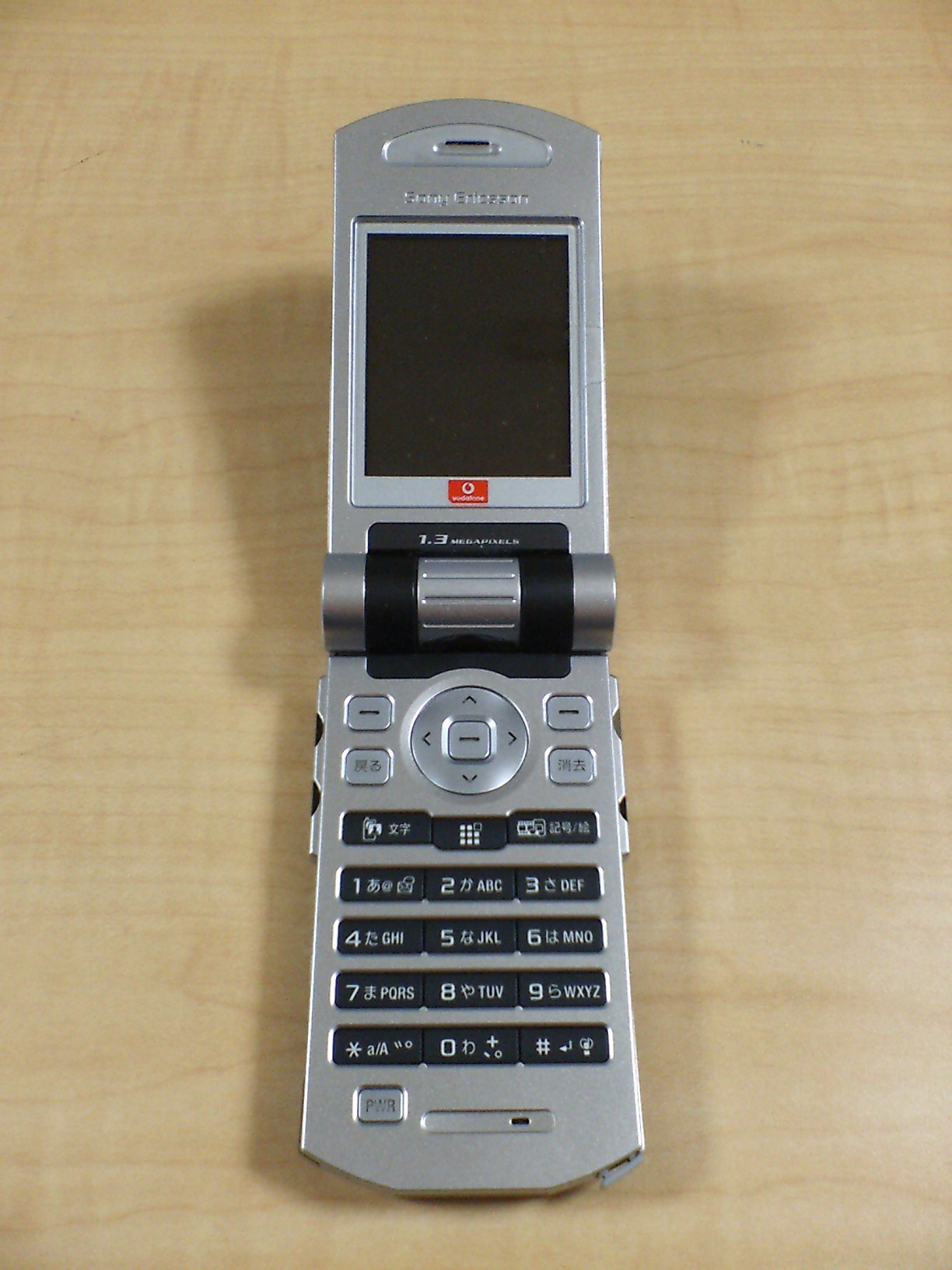
Open Vodafone 802SE (Japan black)

The Sony Ericsson V800 is a mobile phone manufactured by the Japanese-Swedish firm Sony Ericsson and released in late 2004. It is no longer available on the market. The V800 was available in three colors, Black, White and Copper.

The V800 is a triband 3G clamshell phone. It has a rotating camera (which can flip up to 180 degrees) that can take digital photographs in a resolution up to 1.3 megapixels. It supports WAP 2.0, GPRS and UMTS. Its connectivity includes an IrDA port and Bluetooth. It supports polyphonic ringtones in MIDI up to 72 tones, and mobile games in Java ME. Its internal memory (6.8 megabytes) can be expanded with Memory Stick Duo and Memory Stick Duo Pro cards, the latter up to 8 gigabytes, soon available of up to 16 gigabytes.

In Japan, Europe and New Zealand, this phone is only available with Vodafone, and in other countries, it is only available through Vodafone associates (such as Smartone). A similar phone, with different housing is available through other carriers in Europe as the Sony Ericsson Z800i. The Japanese version is called Vodafone 802SE. The Japanese version has cosmetic differences, such as a Japanese keypad and also a differently styled IMEI label inside, underneath the battery, as well as running different firmware and having different packaging. The Japanese version is available in 3 colors: Copper, White and Black; while only the White and Black were sold elsewhere.

== See also ==
- Sony Ericsson Z800i
