= Volumetric haptic display =

Display that informs touch instead of vision

A volumetric haptic display (VHD) is similar to a (visual) volumetric display, but informs touch instead of vision. A VHD projects a touch-based representation of a surface onto a 3D volumetric space. Users can feel the projected surface(s), usually with their hands. The display is otherwise not detectable, and offers no visual feedback. There are no known instances of a fully operational VHD at this time.

== Technological implementation ==
The University of Bristol has developed a method for haptic feedback that could be integrated into a volumetric display. The system uses focused ultrasound to create a haptic object in mid air.

== Feedback ==
The following feedback can be provided to the user:

- Surface contact
- Surface texture
- Vibration
- Motion-based/topological changes of surface

== See also ==
- Optacon (two-dimensional)
- Refreshable Braille Display (two-dimensional).
- Wired glove (partial 3D representation).
