= Sony Ericsson Z800i =

Mobile phone model

- Predecessor: Sony Ericsson Z1010
- Related: Sony Ericsson V800
- Compatible networks: UMTS 2100 MHz Tri-band GSM 900/1800/1900 MHz, GPRS
- Dimensions: 102×49×23.6 mm (4.02×1.93×0.93 in)
- Weight: 128 g (5 oz)
- Memory: Phone memory 7 MB(+/-) Expandable memory up to 4 GB Sony Memory Stick PRO Duo
- Display: Main Screen; Size: 56 mm diagonal Colours: 262,148 TFT; Resolution: 176 x 220 pixels External Screen; Colours: 130K; Resolution: 101 x 80 pixels
- Connectivity: USB, Bluetooth 1.1, Infrared

Sony Ericsson Z800i is a 3G mobile phone developed by Sony Ericsson and released in 2005. The Z800i is a phone that is identical to the Vodafone branded Sony Ericsson V800 (or 802SE in Japan).

It is a 3G and Tri-band phone weighing 128 grams. It has a 1.3-megapixel rotating camera (that can rotate 180 degrees, called the MotionEye camera), that lets you take photos, video and use it during Video Calls.

It supports WAP 2.0, UMTS (or the slower GPRS), polyphonic ringtones in MIDI up to 72 tones, and Java applications. Multimedia files can be stored in its internal memory (5 MBs) or in a Memory Stick PRO Duo card.

== Features ==
- Camera
  1.3-megapixel resolution (1280 x 960 pixels) with 16x digital zoom and photo light
- Multimedia
  Audio playback - AAC, AMR, MP3, MIDI, WAV, WMV, XMF and Truetone
  Video playback - MP4, DiVX, 3GP
  Music and Video Streaming is available
- Java
  Version: MIDP 2.0
  Browsing
  WAP 2.0, XHTML/HTML multimode browser
- Battery performance
  Standby time: 140 hours
  Voice Talk time: 150 min
  Video Talk time: 85 min

== See also ==
- Sony Ericsson V800
