= HR3D =

3D display technology

HR3D is a multiscopic 3D display technology developed at the MIT Media Lab.

== Technology ==
The technology uses double-layered LCD panels.

== Mathematics ==
"HR" stands for "high-rank", and refers to algebraic rank; the related paper describes how light fields can be represented with low rank.
