= Volumetric display =

3D graphic display device

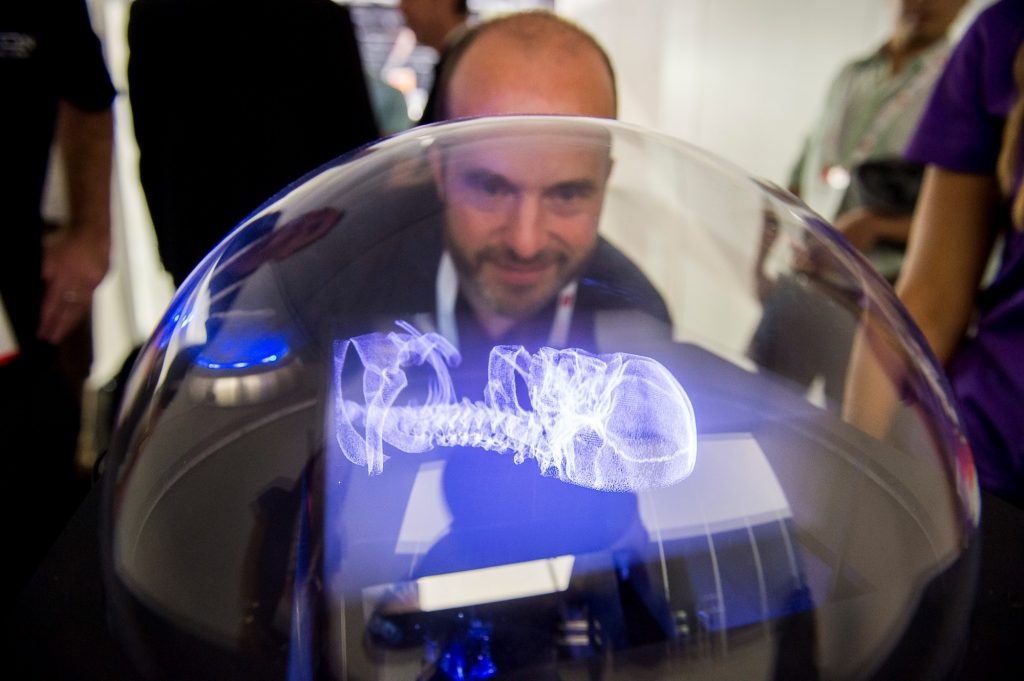
A Voxon VX1 volumetric display showing DICOM medical data

A volumetric display device is a display device that forms a visual representation of an object in three physical dimensions, as opposed to the planar image of traditional screens that simulate depth through a number of different visual effects. One definition offered by pioneers in the field, Barry Blundell and Adam Schwarz, is that volumetric displays create 3D imagery via the emission, scattering, or relaying of illumination from well-defined regions in (x,y,z) space.

A true volumetric display produces in the observer a visual experience of a material object in three-dimensional space, even though no such object is present. The perceived object displays characteristics similar to an actual material object by allowing the observer to view it from any direction, to focus a camera on a specific detail, and to see perspective – meaning that the parts of the image closer to the viewer appear larger than those further away.

Volumetric 3D displays are a type of autostereoscopic display, in that they provide a different view to each eye, thus creating three-dimensional imagery that can be viewed by unaided eyes. However, they have the advantage over most flat-screen autostereoscopic displays, that they are able to provide realistic focal depth in addition to providing motion parallax and vergence, thus avoiding vergence-accommodation conflict.

Volumetric displays are one of several kinds of 3D displays. Other types are stereoscopes, view-sequential displays, electro-holographic displays, "two view" displays, and panoramagrams.

Although first postulated in 1912, and a staple of science fiction, volumetric displays are not widely used in everyday life. There are numerous potential markets for volumetric displays with use cases including medical imaging, mining, education, advertising, simulation, video games, communication and geophysical visualisation. When compared to other 3D visualisation tools such as virtual reality, volumetric displays offer an inherently different mode of interaction, providing the opportunity for a group of people to gather around the display and interact in a natural manner without having to don 3D glasses or other head gear.

== Types ==
Many different attempts have been made to produce volumetric imaging devices. There is no officially accepted "taxonomy" of the variety of volumetric displays, an issue which is complicated by the many permutations of their characteristics. For example, illumination within a volumetric display can either reach the eye directly from the source or via an intermediate surface such as a mirror or glass; likewise, this surface, which need not be tangible, can undergo motion such as oscillation or rotation. One categorization is as follows:

=== Swept-volume display ===
Swept-surface (or "swept-volume") volumetric 3D displays rely on the human persistence of vision to fuse a series of slices of the 3D object into a single 3D image. A variety of swept-volume displays have been created.

For example, the 3D scene is computationally decomposed into a series of "slices", which can be rectangular, disc-shaped, or helically cross-sectioned, whereupon they are projected onto or from a display surface undergoing motion. The image on the 2D surface (created by projection onto the surface, LEDs embedded in the surface, or other techniques) changes as the surface moves or rotates. Due to the persistence of vision, humans perceive a continuous volume of light. The display surface can be reflective, transmissive, or a combination of both.

Another type of 3D display that is a candidate member of the class of swept-volume 3D displays is the varifocal mirror architecture. One of the first references to this type of system is from 1966, in which a vibrating mirrored drumhead reflects a series of patterns from a high-frame-rate 2D image source, such as a vector display, to a corresponding set of depth surfaces.

An example of a commercially available Swept-volume display is the Voxon VX1 from Voxon Photonics. This display has a volume area that is 18 cm × 18 cm × 8 cm (7.1 in × 7.1 in × 3.1 in) deep and can render up to 500 million voxels per second. Content for the VX1 can be created using Unity or using standard 3D file types such as OBJ, STL and DICOM for medical imaging.

=== Static volume ===
So-called "static-volume" volumetric 3D displays create imagery without any macroscopic moving parts in the image volume. It is unclear whether the rest of the system must remain stationary for membership in this display class to be viable.

This is probably the most "direct" form of volumetric display. In the simplest case, an addressable volume of space is created out of active elements that are transparent in the off state but are either opaque or luminous in the on state. When the elements (called voxels) are activated, they show a solid pattern within the space of the display.

Several static-volume volumetric 3D displays use laser light to encourage visible radiation in a solid, liquid, or gas. For example, some researchers have relied on two-step upconversion within a rare-earth-doped material when illuminated by intersecting infrared laser beams of the appropriate frequencies.

Recent advances have focused on non-tangible (free-space) implementations of the static-volume category, which might eventually allow direct interaction with the display. For instance, a fog display using multiple projectors can render a 3D image in a volume of space, resulting in a static-volume volumetric display.

A technique presented in 2006 does away with the display medium altogether, using a focused pulsed infrared laser (about 100 pulses per second; each lasting a nanosecond) to create balls of glowing plasma at the focal point in normal air. The focal point is directed by two moving mirrors and a sliding lens, allowing it to draw shapes in the air. Each pulse creates a popping sound, so the device crackles as it runs. Currently it can generate dots anywhere within a cubic metre. It is thought that the device could be scaled up to any size, allowing 3D images to be generated in the sky.

Later modifications such as the use of a neon/argon/xenon/helium gas mix similar to a plasma globe and a rapid gas recycling system employing a hood and vacuum pumps could allow this technology to achieve two-colour (R/W) and possibly RGB imagery by changing the pulse width and intensity of each pulse to tune the emission spectra of the luminous plasma body.

In 2017, a new display known as the "3D Light PAD" was published. The display's medium consists of a class of photoactivatable molecules (known as spirhodamines) and digital light-processing (DLP) technology to generate structured light in three dimensions. The technique bypasses the need to use high-powered lasers and the generation of plasma, which alleviates concerns for safety and dramatically improves the accessibility of the three-dimensional displays. UV-light and green-light patterns are aimed at the dye solution, which initiates photoactivation and thus creates the "on" voxel. The device is capable of displaying a minimal voxel size of 0.68 mm^{3}, with 200 μm resolution, and good stability over hundreds of on–off cycles.

== Human–computer interfaces ==
The unique properties of volumetric displays, which may include 360-degree viewing, agreement of vergence and accommodation cues, and their inherent "three-dimensionality", enable new user interface techniques. There is recent work investigating the speed and accuracy benefits of volumetric displays, new graphical user interfaces, and medical applications enhanced by volumetric displays.

Also, software platforms exist that deliver native and legacy 2D and 3D content to volumetric displays.

== Technical challenges ==
Known volumetric display technologies also have several drawbacks that are exhibited depending on trade-offs chosen by the system designer.

It is often claimed that volumetric displays are incapable of reconstructing scenes with viewer-position-dependent effects, such as occlusion and opacity. This is a misconception; a display whose voxels have non-isotropic radiation profiles are indeed able to depict position-dependent effects. To-date, occlusion-capable volumetric displays require two conditions: (1) the imagery is rendered and projected as a series of "views", rather than "slices", and (2) the time-varying image surface is not a uniform diffuser. For example, researchers have demonstrated spinning-screen volumetric displays with reflective and/or vertically diffuse screens whose imagery exhibits occlusion and opacity. One system created HPO 3D imagery with a 360-degree field of view by oblique projection onto a vertical diffuser; another projects 24 views onto a rotating controlled-diffusion surface; and another provides 12-view images utilizing a vertically oriented louver.

So far, the ability to reconstruct scenes with occlusion and other position-dependent effects have been at the expense of vertical parallax, in that the 3D scene appears distorted if viewed from locations other than those the scene was generated for.

One other consideration is the very large amount of bandwidth required to feed imagery to a volumetric display. For example, a standard 24 bits per pixel, 1024×768 resolution, flat/2D display requires about 135 MB/s to be sent to the display hardware to sustain 60 frames per second, whereas a 24 bits per voxel, 1024×768×1024 (1024 "pixel layers" in the Z axis) volumetric display would need to send about three orders of magnitude more (135 GB/s) to the display hardware to sustain 60 volumes per second. As with regular 2D video, one could reduce the bandwidth needed by simply sending fewer volumes per second and letting the display hardware repeat frames in the interim, or by sending only enough data to affect those areas of the display that need to be updated, as is the case in modern lossy-compression video formats such as MPEG. Furthermore, a 3D volumetric display would require two to three orders of magnitude more CPU and/or GPU power beyond that necessary for 2D imagery of equivalent quality, due at least in part to the sheer amount of data that must be created and sent to the display hardware. However, if only the outer surface of the volume is visible, the number of voxels required would be of the same order as the number of pixels on a conventional display. This would only be the case if the voxels do not have "alpha" or transparency values.

== See also ==
- Holography
- Volumetric haptic display
- Volumetric video
- Volumetric printing
- Virtual retinal display
- Display device
- 3D display
- Zebra Imaging
- Autostereoscopy
- Multiscopy
- Vergence-accommodation conflict
