= 3D display =

Display device

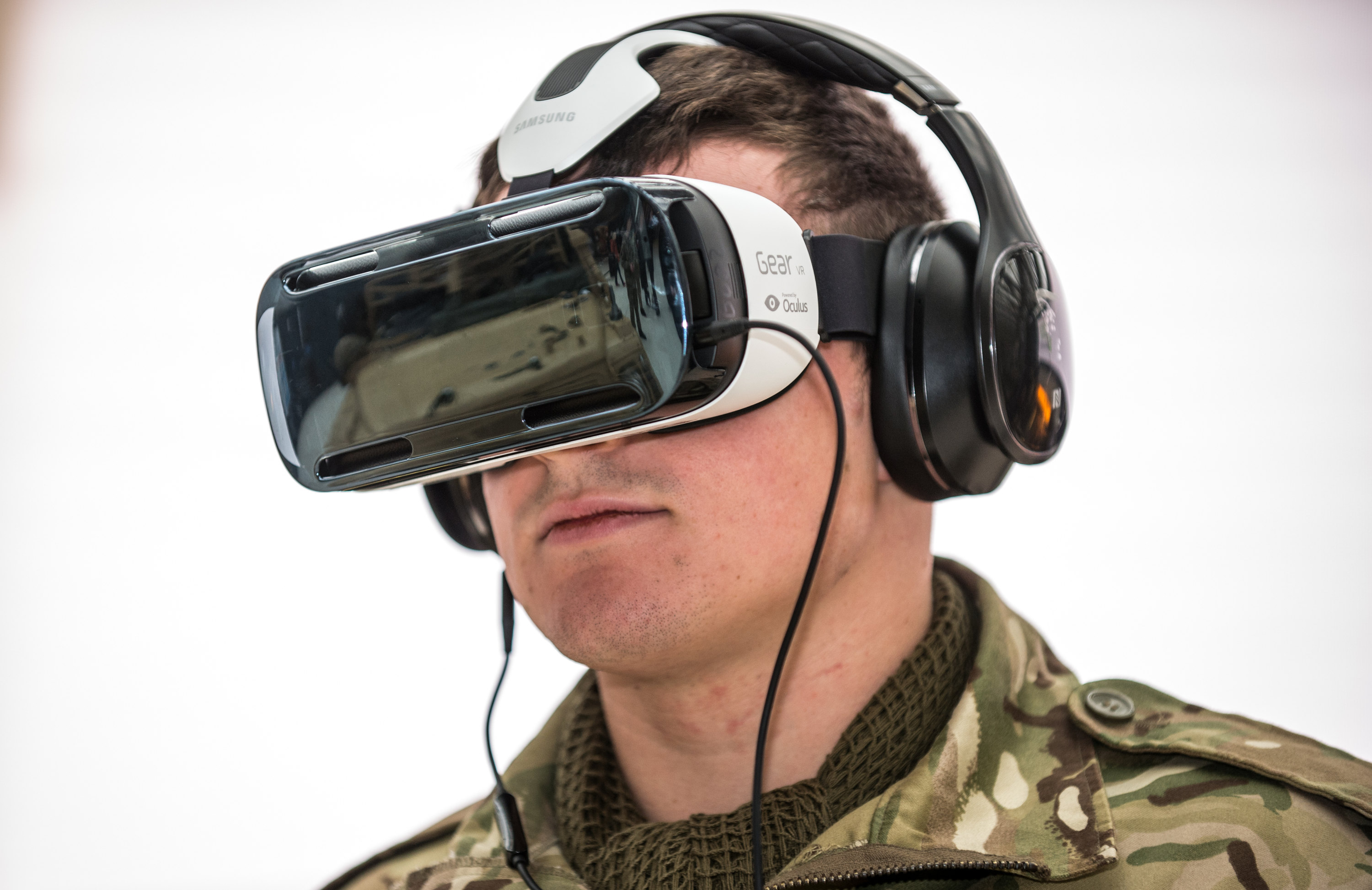
A person wearing a virtual reality headset, a type of 3D display

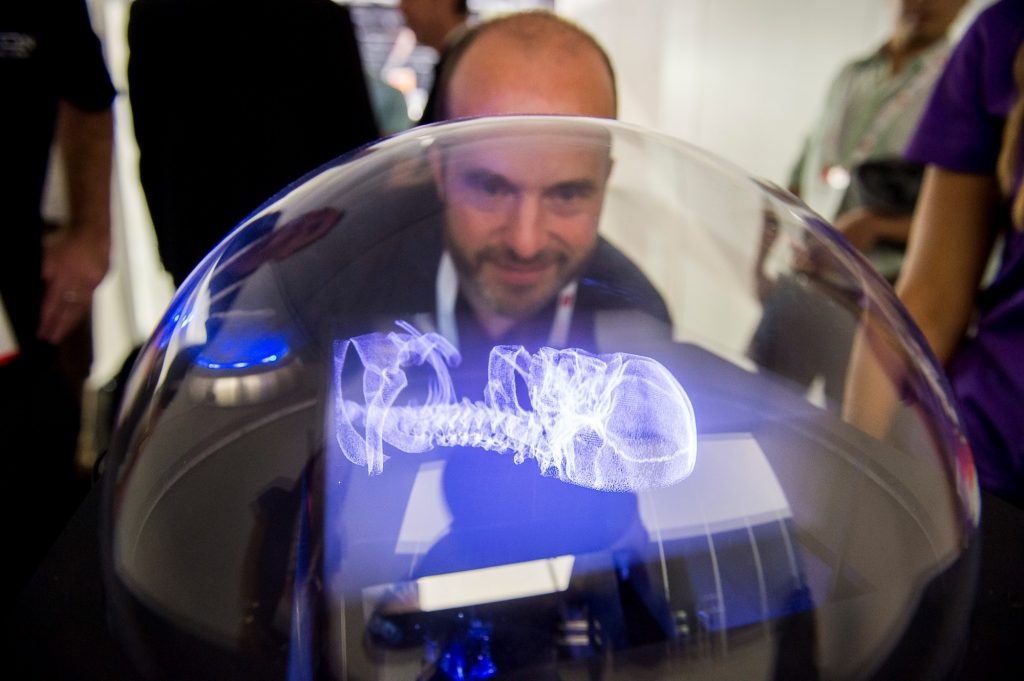
A Voxon VX1 volumetric 3D display showing DICOM medical data

A 3D display is a display device capable of conveying depth to the viewer. Many 3D displays are two-view stereoscopic or autostereoscopic displays, which produce a basic 3D effect from binocular disparity, but can cause eye strain and visual fatigue due to vergence–accommodation conflict. Newer 3D displays such as holographic and light field displays produce a more realistic 3D effect by combining stereopsis and accurate focal length for the displayed content. Newer 3D displays in this manner cause less visual fatigue than classical stereoscopic displays.

As of 2021, the most common type of 3D display is a two-view stereoscopic display, which is the type of display used in almost all virtual reality equipment. 3D displays can be near-eye displays like in VR headsets, or they can be in a device further away from the eyes like a 3D-enabled mobile device or 3D movie theater.

The term "3D display" can also be used to refer to a volumetric display which may generate content that can be viewed from all angles.

A simple form of 3D display is a two-view display, which generates two views, one for the left eye and one for the right eye. One of the earliest form of two-view display is the color anaglyph, which uses color filtered glasses, often red for the left eye and blue for the right eye.

== History ==
The precursor to a 3D display was created by Sir Charles Wheatstone in 1832. It was a stereoscope that had rudimentary ability for representing depth.

Ivan Sutherland developed the first head-mounted display that could show 3D computer graphics.

== Two-view stereoscopic displays ==
Functional principle of two-view active shutter 3D systems

Stereoscopic displays are commonly referred to as "stereo displays," "stereo 3D displays," "stereoscopic 3D displays," or sometimes as just "3D displays."

The basic technique of stereoscopic displays is to present offset images that are displayed separately to the left and right eye. Both of these 2D offset images are then combined in the brain to give the perception of 3D depth. Although the term "3D" is ubiquitously used, the presentation of dual 2D images is distinctly different from displaying a light field, and is also different from displaying an image in three-dimensional space.

The most notable difference to displays that can show full 3D is that the observer's head movements and change in accommodation of the eyes will not change the visuals seen by the viewer. For example, some holographic displays do not have such limitations.

It is an overstatement of capability to refer to dual 2D images as being "3D". The accurate term "stereoscopic" is more cumbersome than the common misnomer "3D", which has been entrenched after many decades of unquestioned misuse. 3D displays are often referred to as also stereoscopic displays because they meet the lower criteria of being stereoscopic as well.

Based on the principles of stereopsis, described by Sir Charles Wheatstone in the 1830s, stereoscopic technology provides a different image to the viewer's left and right eyes. The following are some of the technical details and methodologies employed in some of the more notable stereoscopic systems that have been developed.

=== Side-by-side images ===
Traditional stereoscopic photography consists of creating a 3D effect starting from a pair of 2D images, a stereogram. The easiest way to enhance depth perception in the brain is to provide the eyes of the viewer with two different images, representing two perspectives of the same object, with a minor deviation exactly equal to the perspectives that both eyes naturally receive in binocular vision.

If eyestrain and distortion are to be avoided, each of the two 2D images preferably should be presented to each eye of the viewer so that any object at infinite distance seen by the viewer should be perceived by that eye while it is oriented straight ahead, the viewer's eyes being neither crossed nor diverging. When the picture contains no object at infinite distance, such as a horizon or a cloud, the pictures should be spaced correspondingly closer together.

The side-by-side method is extremely simple to create, but it can be difficult or uncomfortable to view without optical aids.

==== Stereoscope and stereographic cards ====
A stereoscope is a device for viewing stereographic cards, which are cards that contain two separate images that are printed side by side to create the illusion of a three-dimensional image.

==== Transparency viewers ====
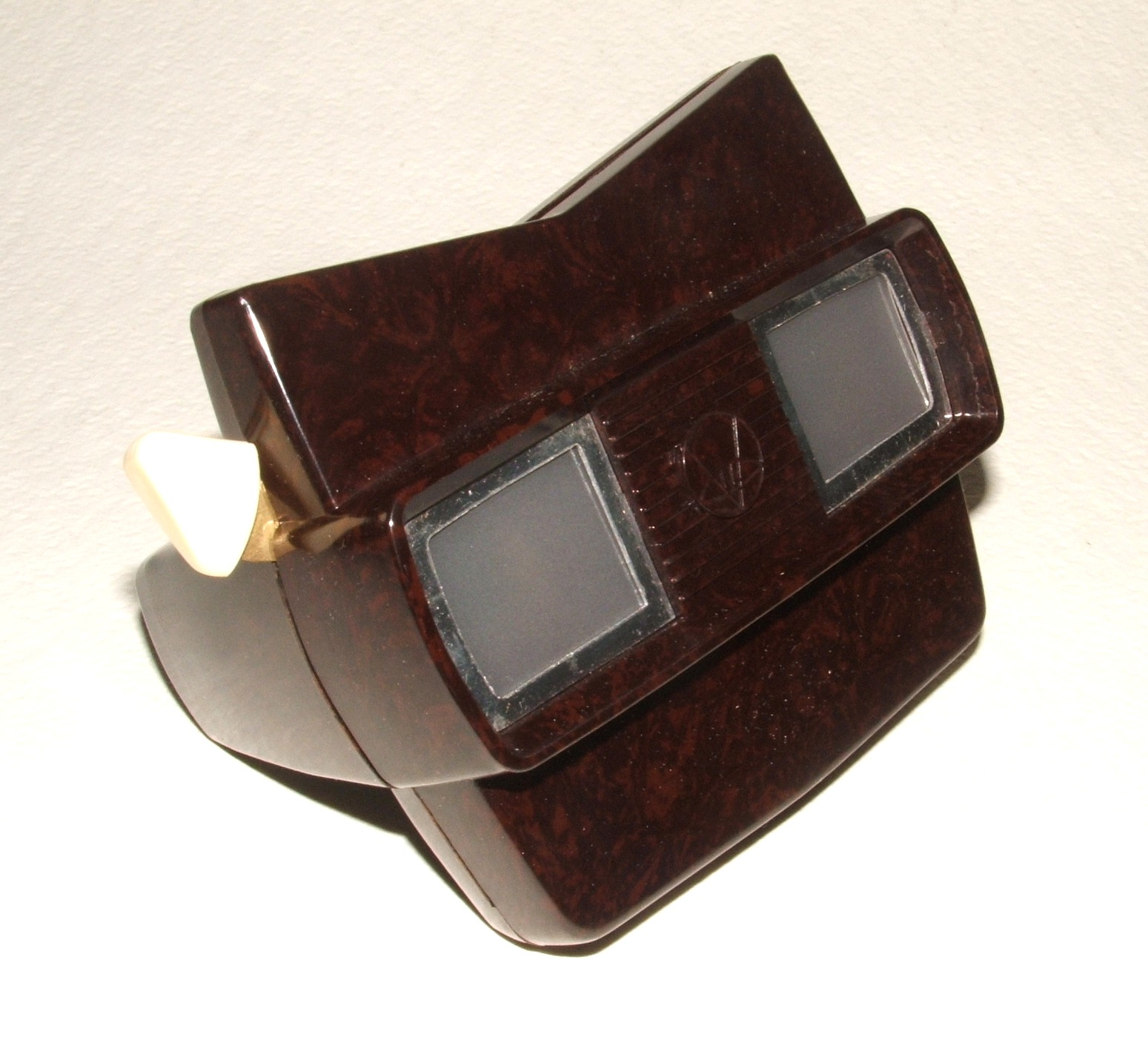
A View-Master Model E of the 1950s

Pairs of stereo views printed on a transparent base are viewed by transmitted light. One advantage of transparency viewing is the opportunity for a wider, more realistic dynamic range than is practical with prints on an opaque base; another is that a wider field of view may be presented since the images, being illuminated from the rear, may be placed much closer to the lenses.

The practice of viewing film-based stereoscopic transparencies dates to at least as early as 1931, when Tru-Vue began to market sets of stereo views on strips of 35 mm film that were fed through a hand-held Bakelite viewer. In 1939, a modified and miniaturized variation of this technology, employing cardboard disks containing seven pairs of small Kodachrome color film transparencies, was introduced as the View-Master.

==== Head-mounted displays ====
The user typically wears a helmet or glasses with two small LCD or OLED displays with magnifying lenses, one for each eye. The technology can be used to show stereo films, images or games. Head-mounted displays may also be coupled with head-tracking devices, allowing the user to "look around" the virtual world by moving their head, eliminating the need for a separate controller.

Owing to rapid advancements in computer graphics and the continuing miniaturization of video and other equipment these devices are beginning to become available at more reasonable cost. Head-mounted or wearable glasses may be used to view a see-through image imposed upon the real world view, creating what is called augmented reality. This is done by reflecting the video images through partially reflective mirrors. The real world can be seen through the partial mirror.

A recent development in holographic-waveguide or "waveguide-based optics" allows a stereoscopic images to be superimposed on real world without the uses of bulky reflective mirror.

==== Head-mounted projection displays ====
Head-mounted projection displays (HMPD) is similar to head-mounted displays but with images projected to and displayed on a retroreflective screen, The advantage of this technology over head-mounted display is that the focusing and vergence issues didn't require fixing with corrective eye lenses. For image generation, pico-projectors are used instead of LCD or OLED screens.

=== 3D glasses ===
==== Active shutter systems ====
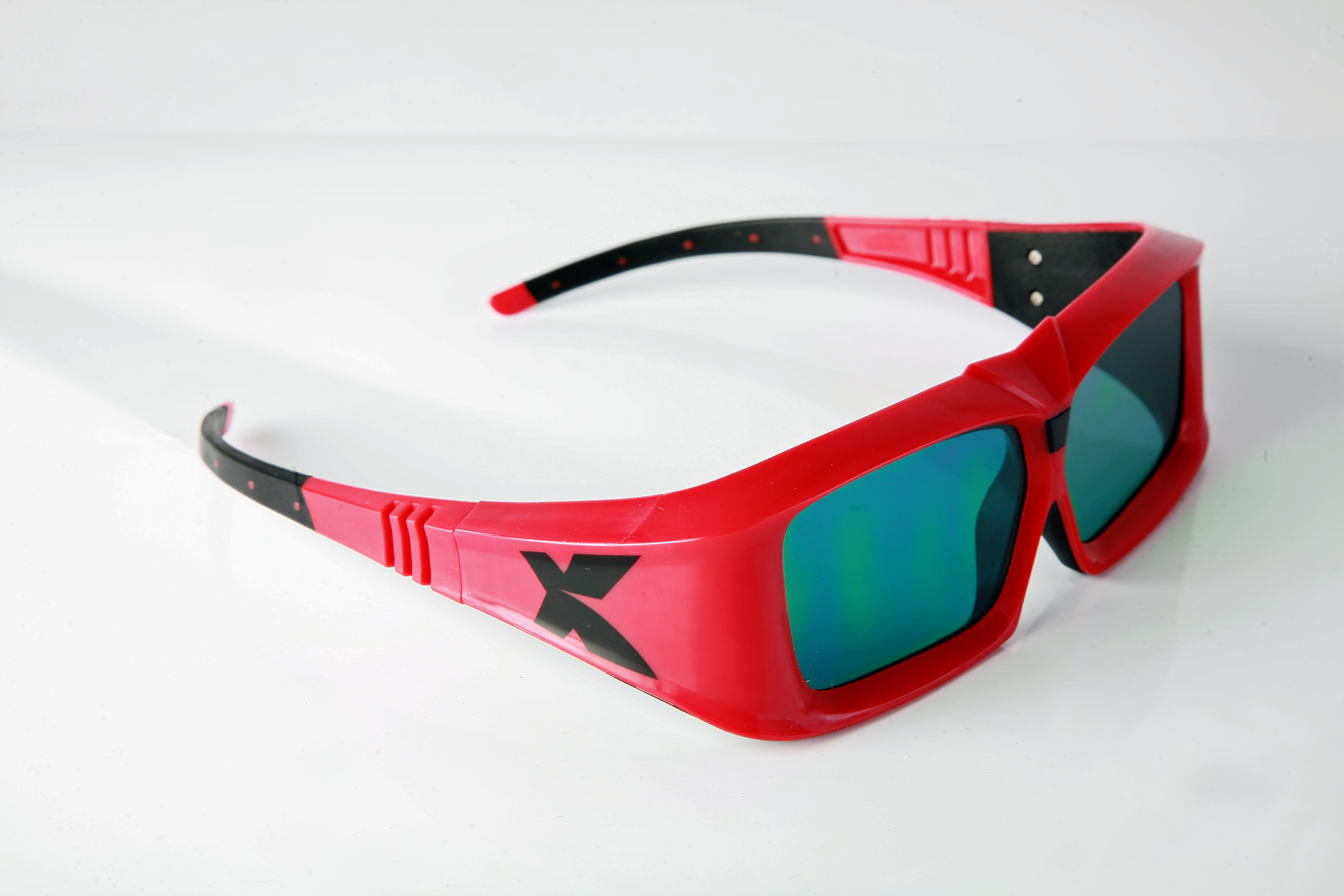
A pair of LCD shutter glasses used to view XpanD 3D films. The thick frames conceal the electronics and batteries.

With the eclipse method, a shutter blocks light from each appropriate eye when the converse eye's image is projected on the screen. The display alternates between left and right images, and opens and closes the shutters in the glasses or viewer in synchronization with the images on the screen. This was the basis of the Teleview system which was used briefly in 1922.

A variation on the eclipse method is used in LCD shutter glasses. Glasses containing liquid crystal that will let light through in synchronization with the images on the cinema, television or computer screen, using the concept of alternate-frame sequencing. This is the method used by nVidia, XpanD 3D, and earlier IMAX systems. A drawback of this method is the need for each person viewing to wear expensive, electronic glasses that must be synchronized with the display system using a wireless signal or attached wire. The shutter-glasses are heavier than most polarized glasses, though lighter models are no heavier than some sunglasses or deluxe polarized glasses. However these systems do not require a silver screen for projected images.

Liquid crystal light valves work by rotating light between two polarizing filters. Due to these internal polarizers, LCD shutter-glasses darken the display image of any LCD, plasma, or projector image source, which has the result that images appear dimmer and contrast is lower than for normal non-3D viewing. This is not necessarily a usage problem; for some types of displays which are already very bright with poor grayish black levels, LCD shutter glasses may actually improve the image quality.

==== Anaglyph ====
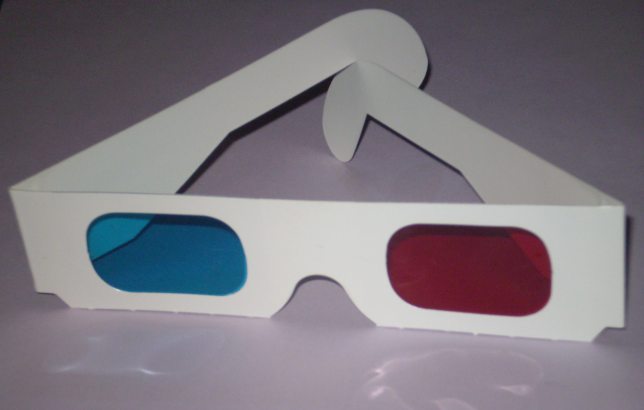
The archetypal 3D glasses, with modern red and cyan color filters, similar to the red/green and red/blue lenses used to view early anaglyph films

In an anaglyph, two images are superimposed in an additive light setting through two filters, one red and one cyan. In a subtractive light setting, the two images are printed in the same complementary colors on white paper. Glasses with colored filters in each eye separate the appropriate image by canceling the filter color out and rendering the complementary color black. A compensating technique, commonly known as Anachrome, uses a slightly more transparent cyan filter in the patented glasses associated with the technique. Process reconfigures the typical anaglyph image to have less parallax.

An alternative to the usual red and cyan filter system of anaglyph is ColorCode 3-D, a patented anaglyph system which was invented in order to present an anaglyph image in conjunction with the NTSC television standard, in which the red channel is often compromised. ColorCode uses the complementary colors of yellow and dark blue on-screen, and the colors of the glasses' lenses are amber and dark blue.

==== Polarization systems ====
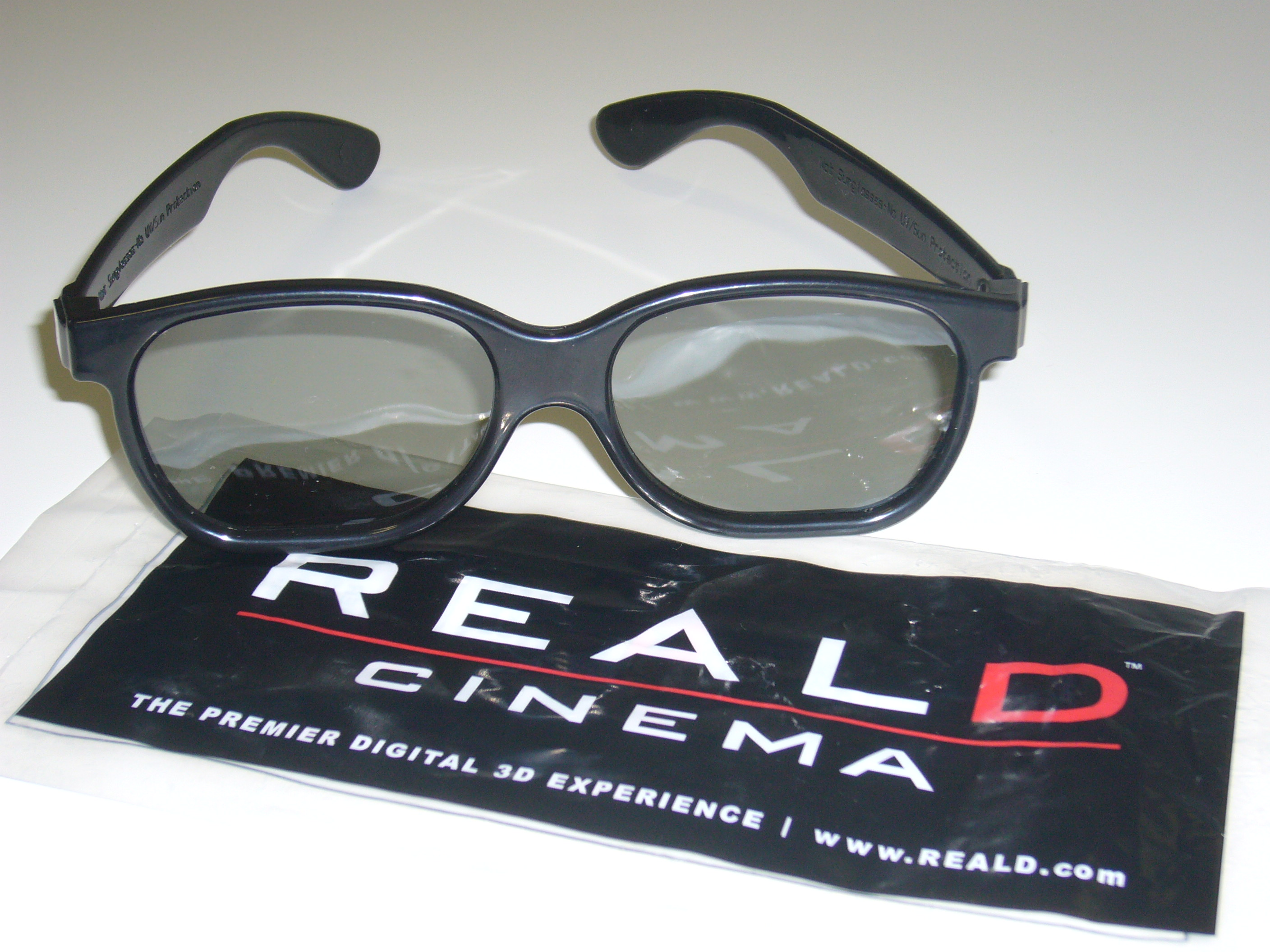
Resembling sunglasses, RealD circular polarized glasses are now the standard for theatrical releases and theme park attractions.

To present a stereoscopic motion pictures, two images are projected superimposed onto the same screen through different polarizing filters. The viewer wears eyeglasses which also contain a pair of polarizing filters oriented differently (clockwise/counterclockwise with circular polarization or at 90 degree angles, usually 45 and 135 degrees, with linear polarization). As each filter passes only that light which is similarly polarized and blocks the light polarized differently, each eye sees a different image. This is used to produce a three-dimensional effect by projecting the same scene into both eyes, but depicted from slightly different perspectives. Additionally, since both lenses have the same color, people with one dominant eye, where one eye is used more, are able to see the colors properly, previously negated by the separation of the two colors.

Circular polarization has an advantage over linear polarization, in that the viewer does not need to have their head upright and aligned with the screen for the polarization to work properly. With linear polarization, turning the glasses sideways causes the filters to go out of alignment with the screen filters causing the image to fade and for each eye to see the opposite frame more easily. For circular polarization, the polarizing effect works regardless of how the viewer's head is aligned with the screen such as tilted sideways, or even upside down. The left eye will still only see the image intended for it, and vice versa, without fading or crosstalk.

Polarized light reflected from an ordinary motion picture screen typically loses most of its polarization. So an expensive silver screen or aluminized screen with negligible polarization loss has to be used. All types of polarization will result in a darkening of the displayed image and poorer contrast compared to non-3D images. Light from lamps is normally emitted as a random collection of polarizations, while a polarization filter only passes a fraction of the light. As a result, the screen image is darker. This darkening can be compensated by increasing the brightness of the projector light source. If the initial polarization filter is inserted between the lamp and the image generation element, the light intensity striking the image element is not any higher than normal without the polarizing filter, and overall image contrast transmitted to the screen is not affected.

==== Interference filter technology ====
Dolby 3D uses specific wavelengths of red, green, and blue for the right eye, and different wavelengths of red, green, and blue for the left eye. Eyeglasses which filter out the very specific wavelengths allow the wearer to see a 3D image. This technology eliminates the expensive silver screens required for polarized systems such as RealD, which is the most common 3D display system in theaters. It does, however, require much more expensive glasses than the polarized systems. It is also known as spectral comb filtering or wavelength multiplex visualization

The Omega 3D/Panavision 3D system also uses this technology, though with a wider spectrum and more "teeth" to the "comb" (5 for each eye in the Omega/Panavision system). The use of more spectral bands per eye eliminates the need to color process the image, required by the Dolby system. Evenly dividing the visible spectrum between the eyes gives the viewer a more relaxed "feel" as the light energy and color balance is nearly 50–50. Like the Dolby system, the Omega system can be used with white or silver screens. But it can be used with either film or digital projectors, unlike the Dolby filters that are only used on a digital system with a color correcting processor provided by Dolby. The Omega/Panavision system also claims that their glasses are cheaper to manufacture than those used by Dolby. In June 2012, the Omega 3D/Panavision 3D system was discontinued by DPVO Theatrical, who marketed it on behalf of Panavision, citing "challenging global economic and 3D market conditions". Although DPVO dissolved its business operations, Omega Optical continues promoting and selling 3D systems to non-theatrical markets. Omega Optical’s 3D system contains projection filters and 3D glasses. In addition to the passive stereoscopic 3D system, Omega Optical has produced enhanced anaglyph 3D glasses. The Omega’s red/cyan anaglyph glasses use complex metal oxide thin film coatings and high quality annealed glass optics.

==== Other ====
The Pulfrich effect is a psychophysical percept wherein lateral motion of an object in the field of view is interpreted by the visual cortex as having a depth component, due to a relative difference in signal timings between the two eyes.

Prismatic glasses make cross-viewing easier as well as over/under-viewing possible, examples include the KMQ viewer.

=== Autostereoscopy ===
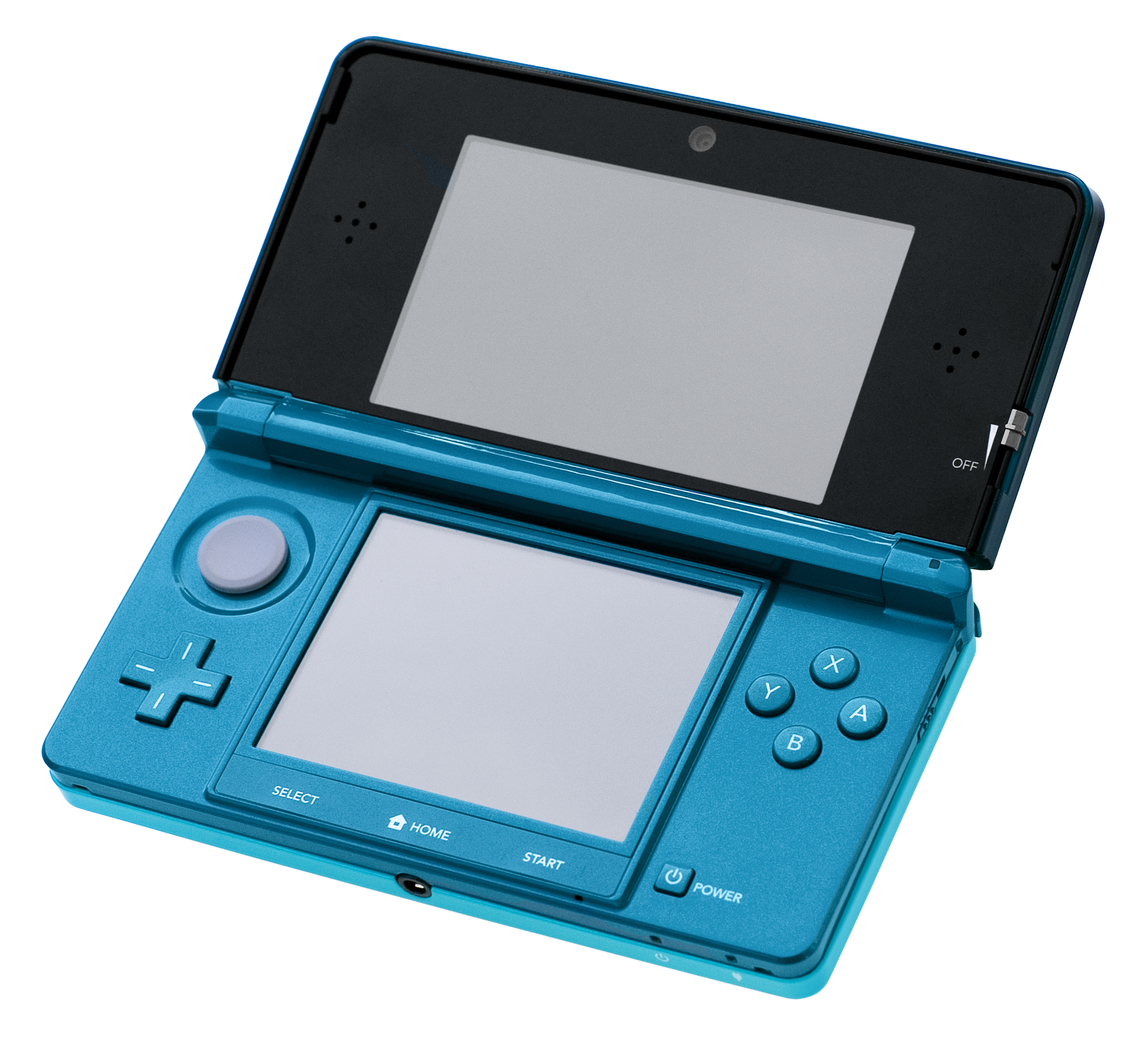
The Nintendo 3DS uses parallax barrier autostereoscopy to display a 3D image.

In this method, glasses are not necessary to see the stereoscopic image. Lenticular lens and parallax barrier technologies involve imposing two (or more) images on the same sheet, in narrow, alternating strips, and using a screen that either blocks one of the two images' strips (in the case of parallax barriers) or uses equally narrow lenses to bend the strips of image and make it appear to fill the entire image (in the case of lenticular prints). To produce the stereoscopic effect, the person must be positioned so that one eye sees one of the two images and the other sees the other. The optical principles of multiview auto-stereoscopy have been known for over a century.

Both images are projected onto a high-gain, corrugated screen which reflects light at acute angles. In order to see the stereoscopic image, the viewer must sit within a very narrow angle that is nearly perpendicular to the screen, limiting the size of the audience. Lenticular was used for theatrical presentation of numerous shorts in Russia from 1940 to 1948 and in 1946 for the feature-length film Robinzon Kruzo.

Though its use in theatrical presentations has been rather limited, lenticular has been widely used for a variety of novelty items and has even been used in amateur 3D photography. Recent use includes the Fujifilm FinePix Real 3D with an autostereoscopic display that was released in 2009. Other examples for this technology include autostereoscopic LCD displays on monitors, notebooks, TVs, mobile phones and gaming devices, such as the Nintendo 3DS.

== Volumetric display ==
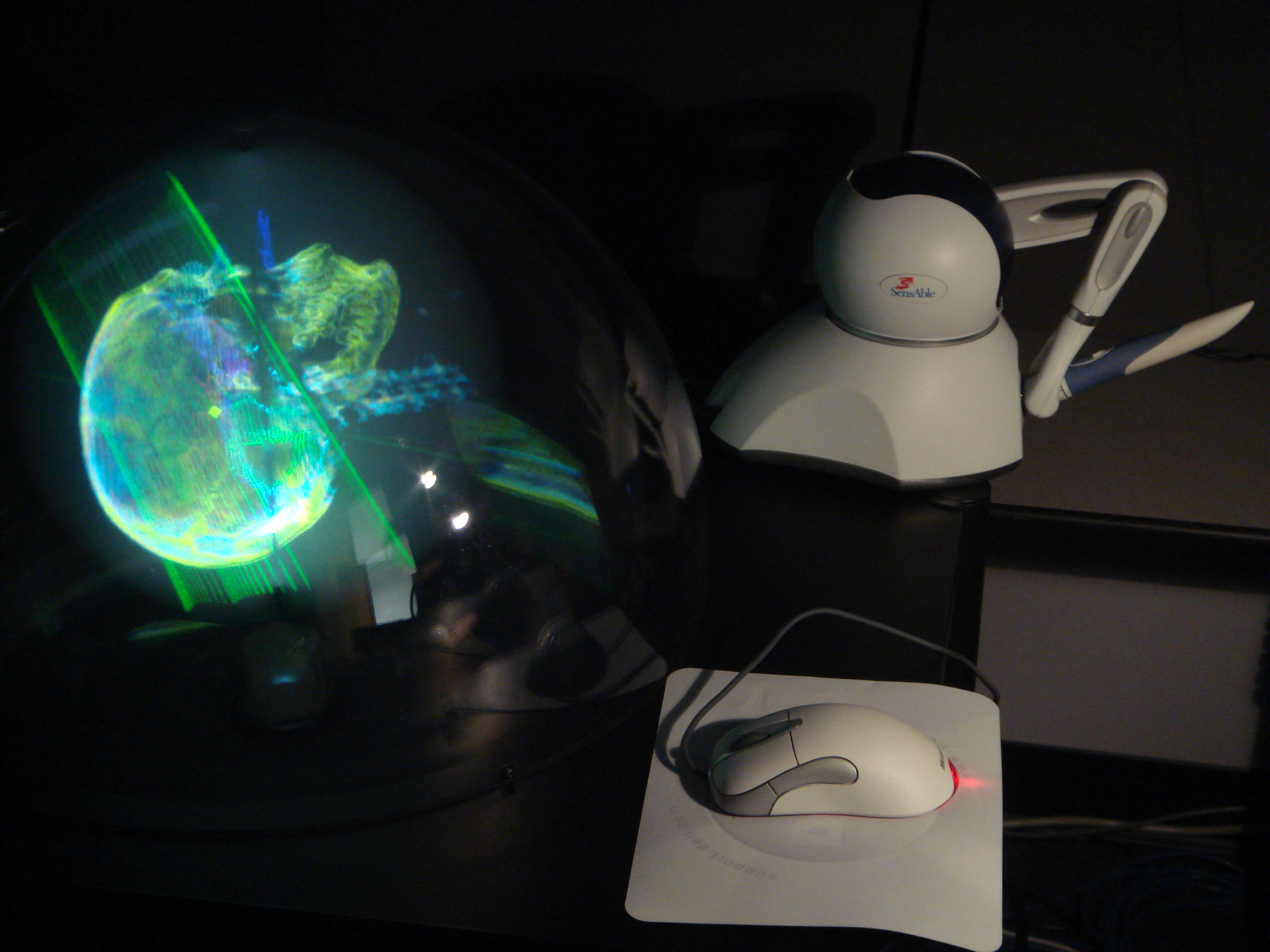
An volumetric 3D display (left) with a 6DOF haptic input device (right)

Volumetric displays use some physical mechanism to display points of light within a volume. Such displays use voxels instead of pixels. Volumetric displays include multiplanar displays, which have multiple display planes stacked up, and rotating panel displays, where a rotating panel sweeps out a volume.

Other technologies have been developed to project light dots in the air above a device. An infrared laser is focused on the destination in space, generating a small bubble of plasma which emits visible light.

== Light field / holographic display ==
A light field display recreates a portion of a light field on the surface of the display. In contrast to a 2D display which shows a distinct color on each pixel, a light field display shows a distinct color for each ray. This way, eyes from different positions will see different pictures on the display, creating parallax and thus creating a sense of 3D. A light field display is like a glass window, people see 3D objects behind the glass, despite that all light rays they see come from (through) the glass.

The light field in front of the display can be created in two ways: 1) by emitting different light rays in different directions at each point on the display; 2) by recreating a wavefront in front of the display. Displays using the first method are called ray-based or light field displays. Displays using the second method are called wavefront-based or holographic displays. Wavefront-based displays work in the same way as holograms. Compared to ray-based displays, a wavefront-based display not only reconstructs the light field, but also reconstructs the curvature of the plane waves, and the phase differences of the waves in different directions.

Integral photography is one of the ray-based methods with full-parallax information. However, there are also ray-based techniques developed with horizontal-parallax-only.

=== Holographic displays ===
Holographic display is a display technology that has the ability to provide all four eye mechanisms: binocular disparity, motion parallax, accommodation and convergence. The 3D objects can be viewed without wearing any special glasses and no visual fatigue will be caused to human eyes.

In 2013, a Silicon valley Company LEIA Inc started manufacturing autostereoscopic displays marketed as holographic display for mobile devices (watches, smartphones or tablets) using a multi-directional backlight and allowing a wide full-parallax angle view to see 3D content. Their first product was part of a mobile phone (Red Hydrogen One) and later on in their own Android tablet.

=== Integral imaging ===
Integral imaging is an autostereoscopic or multiscopic 3D display, meaning that it displays a 3D image without the use of special glasses on the part of the viewer. It achieves this by placing an array of microlenses (similar to a lenticular lens) in front of the image, where each lens looks different depending on viewing angle. Thus rather than displaying a 2D image that looks the same from every direction, it reproduces a 3D light field, creating stereo images that exhibit parallax when the viewer moves.

=== Compressive light field displays ===
A new display technology called "compressive light field" is being developed. These prototype displays use layered LCD panels and compression algorithms at the time of display. Designs include dual and multilayer devices that are driven by algorithms such as computed tomography and non-negative matrix factorization and non-negative tensor factorization.

== Problems ==
Each of these display technologies can be seen to have limitations, whether the location of the viewer, cumbersome or unsightly equipment or great cost. The display of artifact-free 3D images remains difficult.

== See also ==
- Autostereogram
- Wiggle stereoscopy
- 3D human-computer interaction
