= Multiscopy =

Technique for creating or enhancing the impression of depth in an image

A 3D display is multiscopic if it projects more than two images out into the world, unlike conventional 3D stereoscopy, which simulates a 3D scene by displaying only two different views of it, each visible to only one of the viewer's eyes. Multiscopic displays can represent the subject as viewed from a series of locations, and allow each image to be visible only from a range of eye locations narrower than the average human interocular distance of 63 mm. As a result, not only does each eye see a different image, but different pairs of images are seen from different viewing locations.

This allows the observer to view the 3D subject from different angles as they move their head, simulating the real-world depth cue of motion parallax. It also reduces or eliminates the complication of pseudoscopic viewing zones typical of "no glasses" 3D displays that use only two images, making it possible for several randomly located observers to all see the subject in correct 3D at the same time.

Photographic images of this type were named parallax panoramagrams by inventor Herbert E. Ives circa 1930, but that term is strongly associated with a continuous sampling of horizontal viewpoints, captured by a camera with a very wide lens or a lens that travels horizontally during the exposure. The more recently coined term has increasingly been adopted as more accurately descriptive when referring to electronic systems that capture and display only a finite number of discrete views.

== Examples ==
Examples of multiscopic (as opposed to stereoscopic) 3D technologies include:

- Parallax-based technologies
  - parallax barriers
  - lenticular 3D (using an array of very narrow cylindrical lenses)
  - integral imaging (using an X–Y or "fly's-eye" array of spherical lenslets)
- Volumetric technologies:
  - sweeping a projection across subsurfaces
  - transparent substrates (such as "intersecting laser beams, fog layers")
- Holography (including real-time holography)
