= Pseudoscope =

Binocular optical instrument that reverses depth perception

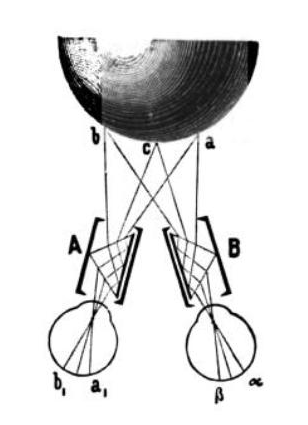
Charles Wheatstone's prismatic pseudoscope. It switched the images presented to each eye to distort depth perception.

A pseudoscope is a binocular optical instrument that reverses depth perception. It is used to study human stereoscopic perception. Objects viewed through it appear inside out, for example: a box on a floor would appear as a box-shaped hole in the floor.

It typically uses sets of optical prisms, or periscopically arranged mirrors to swap the view of the left eye with that of the right eye.

== Purpose ==
In the 1800s Charles Wheatstone coined the name from the Greek ψευδίς σκοπειν – 'false view'. The device was used to explore his theory of stereo vision.

Basically, pseudoscopic vision is three-dimensional vision in reverse. For example, in aerial photography, swimming pools appear to look like buildings and buildings appear to look like swimming pools. In red and green plotters like the Kelsh and Multiplex this is achieved by reversing the lenses on the 3D glasses. The images will be reverse order. The right image will be viewed through the left eye, and the left image will be through the right eye.

== Effect ==
Switching the two pictures in a standard stereoscope changes all the elevated parts into depressions, and vice versa. The pseudoscope also changes convex into concave, and high-relief into low-relief.

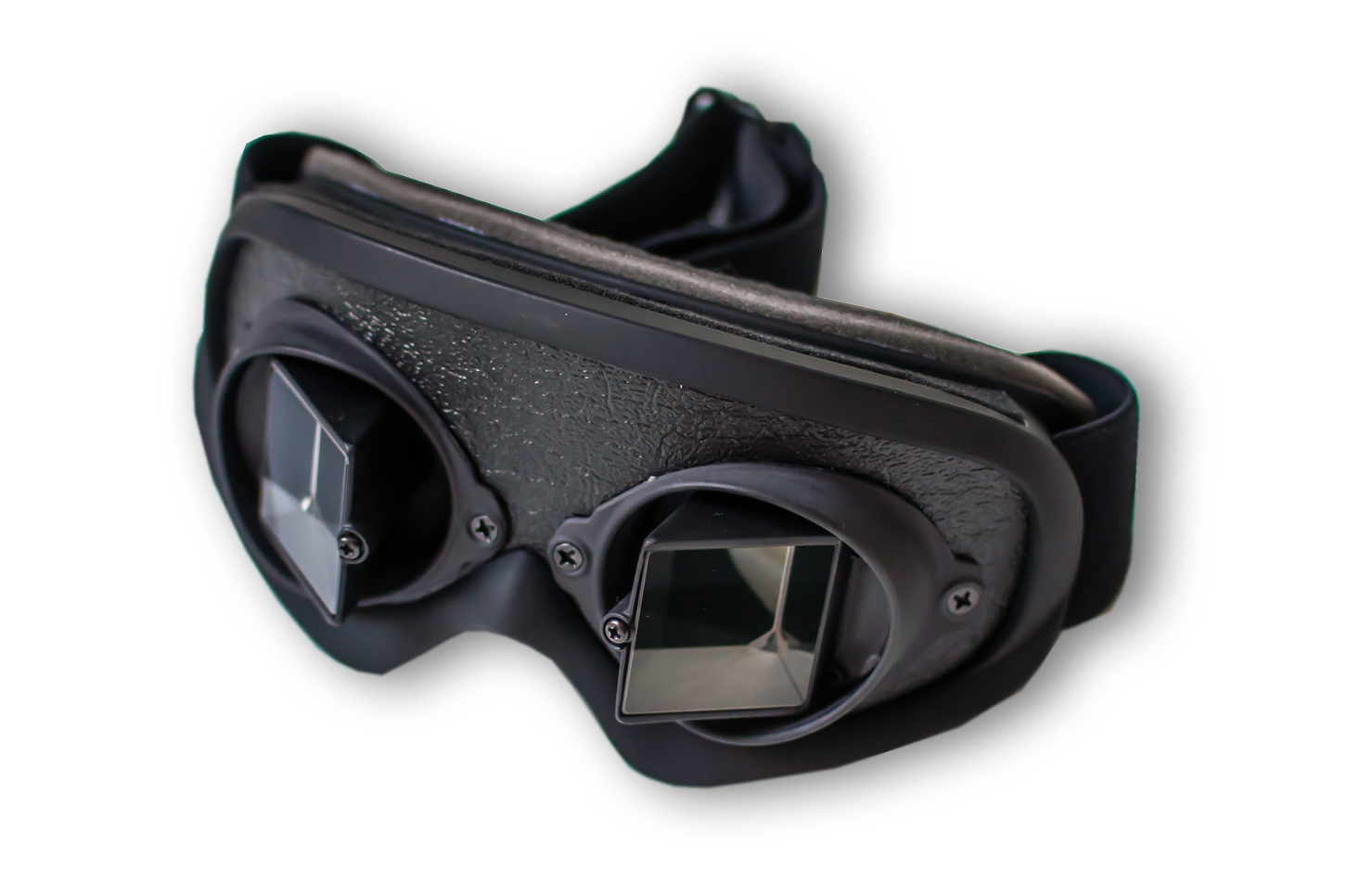
Modern prismatic pseudoscope by Charles Whetstone's scheme

== History ==
Pseudoscopic binocular microscope design by Father Cherubin d'Orleans, 1677

Before the pseudoscope itself was created intentionally, it existed in binocular instruments as an imperfection. The first binocular microscope was invented by the Capuchin friar Cherubin d'Orleans. Because his instrument consisted of two inverting systems, it produced a pseudoscopic impression of depth by accident, although not recognized by microscopists of the time.

G. M. Stratton's mirror pseudoscope

The instrument subsequently fell into complete neglect for nearly two centuries. It was revived in 1852 by Charles Wheatstone, who published his ideas in his paper "On Binocular Vision", in the Philosophical Transactions for 1852. Wheatstone's paper stimulated the investigation of binocular vision and many variations of pseudoscopes were created, chief types being the mirror or the prismatic.

In 1853 the American scientist John Leonard Riddell (1807–1865) devised his binocular microscope, which contained the essentials of Wheatstone's pseudoscope.
