= Sensory conflict theory =

Theory of motion sickness

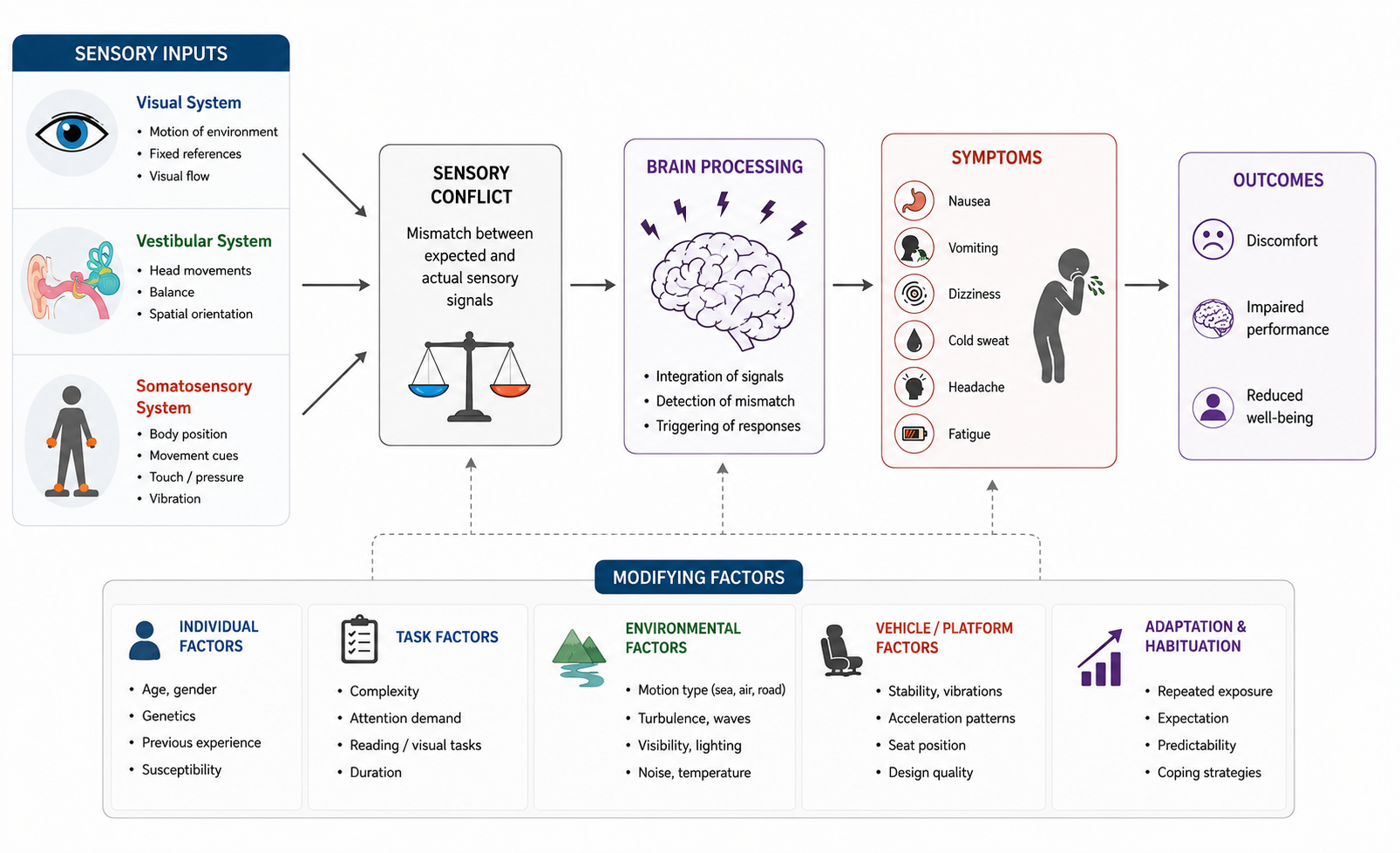
An infographic diagram showing the physiological pathway of motion sickness through sensory systems, central nervous processing, symptoms, and final outcomes, alongside the external and individual factors that modify its severity.

Sensory conflict theory (also known as sensory rearrangement theory) is a theory of motion sickness proposing that symptoms arise from a mismatch between sensory information from the visual system, the vestibular system, and proprioception, or between incoming sensory signals and internally stored expectations based on previous experience. According to the theory, persistent or sufficiently intense sensory conflicts generate a neural mismatch signal that produces symptoms including nausea, dizziness, disorientation, pallor, and vomiting. A common example occurs when reading in a moving car or train, where visual information indicates little or no motion while the vestibular system detects acceleration, creating the sensory mismatch proposed by the theory.

The sensory conflict theory was originally proposed to explain conventional motion sickness and was later extended to related conditions including simulator sickness, virtual reality sickness, and space motion sickness. It has served as the foundation for numerous experimental and computational models of motion sickness and has influenced research in neuroscience, vestibular physiology, human–computer interaction, virtual reality, aerospace medicine, and transportation. Symptoms are generally thought to diminish with repeated exposure, as the central nervous system partially adapts to persistent sensory conflicts. The occurrence and severity of symptoms are also influenced by a range of modifying factors, including individual characteristics such as age, genetics, prior experience, and susceptibility, task-related aspects such as cognitive demands and exposure duration, environmental conditions, vehicle or platform properties, and processes of adaptation and habituation.

Although sensory conflict theory is widely accepted as a major framework for explaining motion sickness, it does not account for all observed phenomena and has been complemented or challenged by alternative explanations, including postural instability theory and other models of sensorimotor adaptation.

== Historical development ==
=== Early observations ===
Before the development of sensory conflict theory, motion sickness was generally explained as the result of abnormal stimulation of the vestibular system. During the nineteenth and early twentieth centuries, physiological studies established that the vestibular organs of the inner ear played a central role in the perception of motion and balance, leading researchers to regard motion sickness primarily as a vestibular disorder. Observations that individuals with impaired vestibular function were often less susceptible to motion sickness further supported this interpretation.

By the mid-twentieth century, however, it had become increasingly apparent that vestibular stimulation alone could not account for all forms of motion sickness. Experimental findings showed that visual conditions, body orientation, and previous experience could substantially influence symptom severity, suggesting that multiple sensory systems contributed to the perception of self-motion.

=== Sensory rearrangement theory ===
A major conceptual shift occurred with the publication of Motion Sickness by James Reason and J. J. Brand in 1975. Rather than attributing motion sickness solely to abnormal vestibular stimulation, they proposed that symptoms arise from a conflict between information provided by the visual, vestibular, and somatosensory systems and sensory patterns established through previous experience. They referred to this explanation as the sensory rearrangement theory, arguing that motion sickness results when the central nervous system is unable to reconcile conflicting sensory inputs.

Reason and Brand's formulation unified a wide range of phenomena under a single explanatory framework and was subsequently applied to conventional motion sickness as well as to conditions such as simulator sickness, space motion sickness, and visually induced motion sickness.

=== Neural mismatch hypothesis ===
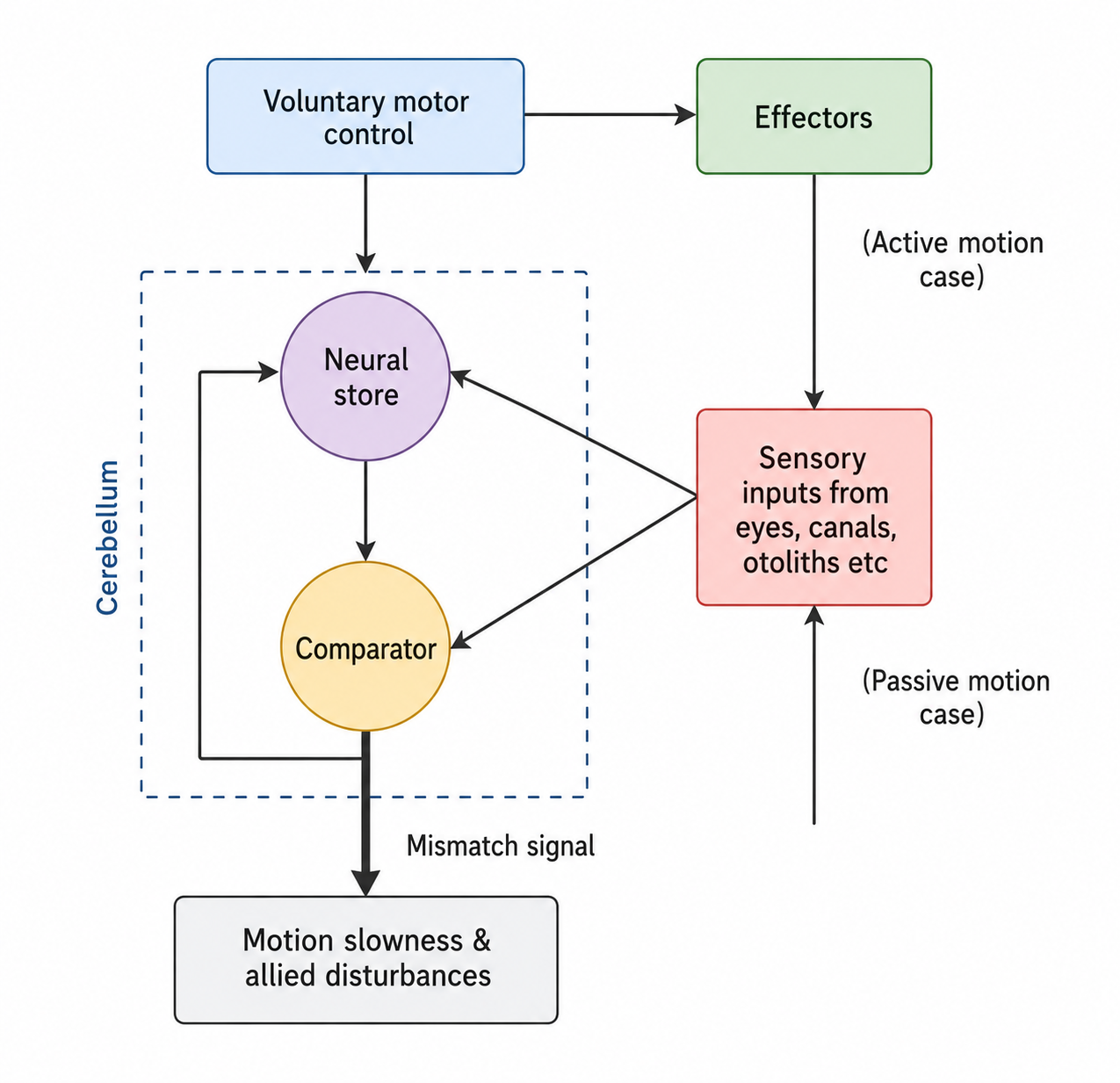
Simplified schematic of the sensory conflict and neural mismatch mechanism underlying motion sickness, based on the model of Charles M. Oman (1982).

Reason later refined the theory by introducing the concept of a neural mismatch, proposing that incoming sensory information is continuously compared with internally stored representations of expected sensory input, sometimes referred to as the neural store. Motion sickness was proposed to occur when discrepancies between expected and actual sensory information exceed the nervous system's capacity to resolve them through adaptation.

The neural mismatch formulation shifted the emphasis from the existence of sensory conflict itself to the processes by which the central nervous system interprets and adapts to conflicting sensory signals, becoming one of the most influential versions of sensory conflict theory.

=== Subsequent refinements ===
During the 1980s and 1990s, the theory was further refined and extended. Charles M. Oman developed a mathematical model describing the accumulation and resolution of sensory conflict over time, providing a quantitative framework that accounted for the onset, severity, and adaptation of motion sickness symptoms. Around the same period, R. L. Kohl proposed a possible neuroanatomical basis for the neural mismatch mechanism, suggesting that the conflict underlying space motion sickness could arise within specific regions of the central nervous system.

Subsequent reviews have described sensory conflict theory as one of the principal conceptual frameworks for explaining motion sickness, while also noting that it has been complemented and challenged by alternative models, particularly those emphasizing postural control and sensorimotor adaptation.

== Core principles ==
=== Types of sensory conflict ===
Sensory conflicts can arise from several distinct sources, depending on which sensory systems are involved and how their signals differ from each other or from expected patterns of self-motion.

==== Visual–vestibular conflict ====
Visual–vestibular conflict refers to discrepancies between visual information and signals from the vestibular system. The vestibular apparatus, located in the inner ear, provides information about linear and angular acceleration, whereas vision provides external cues about motion and spatial orientation. Motion sickness is proposed to occur when these two sources of information yield incompatible estimates of self-motion. This type of conflict is widely described in the literature as the most common mechanism underlying motion sickness. It is particularly relevant in situations where visual cues suggest stability while the body is in motion, or where visually induced motion occurs without corresponding vestibular stimulation. Such inconsistencies result in competing estimates of self-motion that cannot be simultaneously reconciled by the central nervous system.

==== Canal–otolith conflict ====
Canal–otolith conflict arises within the vestibular system itself, between signals generated by the semicircular canals and those generated by the otolith organs. The semicircular canals detect angular acceleration, while the otolith organs respond to linear acceleration and gravitational force. Under normal conditions these signals are mutually consistent. However, certain motion environments can produce patterns in which canal and otolith inputs are incongruent, contributing to sensory mismatch.

==== Intravestibular conflict ====
Intravestibular conflict refers more broadly to inconsistencies among different components of vestibular processing, particularly when expected patterns of vestibular activation do not match actual sensory input. This form of conflict is especially relevant in environments with altered gravitational conditions, such as spaceflight, where the normal relationship between linear acceleration and gravitational cues is disrupted.

==== Conflict with internal expectation ====
Sensory conflict theory also encompasses mismatches between incoming sensory signals and internally stored expectations of sensory consequences during self-motion, expectations shaped by prior experience and motor commands. This mechanism is elaborated below as the neural store.

=== The neural store ===
The neural store is a theoretical internal representation of previously experienced patterns of sensory input associated with self-motion, built up from prior experience and efference-copy predictions of motor commands. The central nervous system is proposed to continuously compare incoming sensory information against this stored reference to evaluate its consistency with past experience.

When sensory input diverges from the patterns encoded in the neural store, a mismatch signal is generated. Repeated exposure to a specific motion environment is thought to update the neural store over time, allowing partial adaptation and reduced susceptibility to motion sickness with continued exposure.

=== Mismatch signal and symptom severity ===
According to sensory conflict theory, motion sickness severity is related to both the magnitude and duration of the sensory mismatch signal. Larger discrepancies between expected and actual sensory input, or mismatches that persist without resolution, are associated with stronger autonomic and perceptual symptoms, including nausea and vomiting.

Adaptation processes may reduce symptom severity by updating internal representations of expected sensory input, thereby reducing the degree of mismatch experienced during repeated or prolonged exposure to similar motion conditions.

== Computational models ==
=== Observer framework models ===
Building on the heuristic conflict model, Oman proposed that the central nervous system's estimation of self-motion can be formalized as a control-theoretic observer in the sense of D. G. Luenberger and W. M. Wonham, generating a deterministic state estimate from an internal model rather than a stochastic (Kalman filter type) estimate. The body and its sensory organs are represented as a linearized state-space system:

$$\dot{x} = Ax + Bu, \qquad a = Sx + n_a$$

where $x$ is the true, unobservable state of self-motion (e.g. joint angles, canal and otolith deflection), $u$ is the forcing vector combining motor outflow and external disturbance, $a$ is the vector of actual sensory afference, $S$ is a matrix of sensory-organ gains, and $n_a$ is sensory noise. Since the CNS cannot access $x$ directly, it is proposed to maintain an internal model, estimated matrices $\hat{A}, \hat{B}, \hat{S}$, from which it generates a state estimate $\hat{x}$ and a corresponding expected sensory input $\hat{a} = \hat{S}\hat{x}$. The sensory conflict vector is then the discrepancy between actual and expected afference:

$$c = a - \hat{a}$$

This signal is fed back into the state estimate through an observer gain matrix $K$, chosen so that noisier sensory modalities are weighted less heavily:

$$\dot{\hat{x}} = \hat{A}\hat{x} + \hat{B}m + Kc$$

Substituting the definition of the conflict signal, $c = a - \hat{S}\hat{x}$, and collecting terms in $\hat{x}$ gives an equivalent, commonly diagrammed form of the same equation:

$$\dot{\hat{x}} = (\hat{A} - K\hat{S})\hat{x} + \hat{B}m + Ka$$

in which the estimate update is driven by three additively combined terms: the motor-outflow term $\hat{B}m$, the actual-sensory-input term $Ka$, and an internally generated feedback term $(\hat{A} - K\hat{S})\hat{x}$ that replaces the separate model-dynamics and conflict-correction terms of the first form. The estimated state $\hat{x}$ is not purely perceptual: in Oman's formulation it also closes the loop with motor control. A controller $C$ compares the estimated state to a desired state $x_d$ and generates the motor outflow $m$ that both actuates movement and feeds forward into the internal model, so that the same estimate that resolves sensory conflict also drives the ongoing correction of self-motion. Oman noted that this formulation is functionally analogous to the correlation-storage/neural-store elements of earlier models by Reason, but avoids the need to define a discrete temporal trace, since the internal model continuously regenerates expected sensory consequences rather than storing past traces directly.

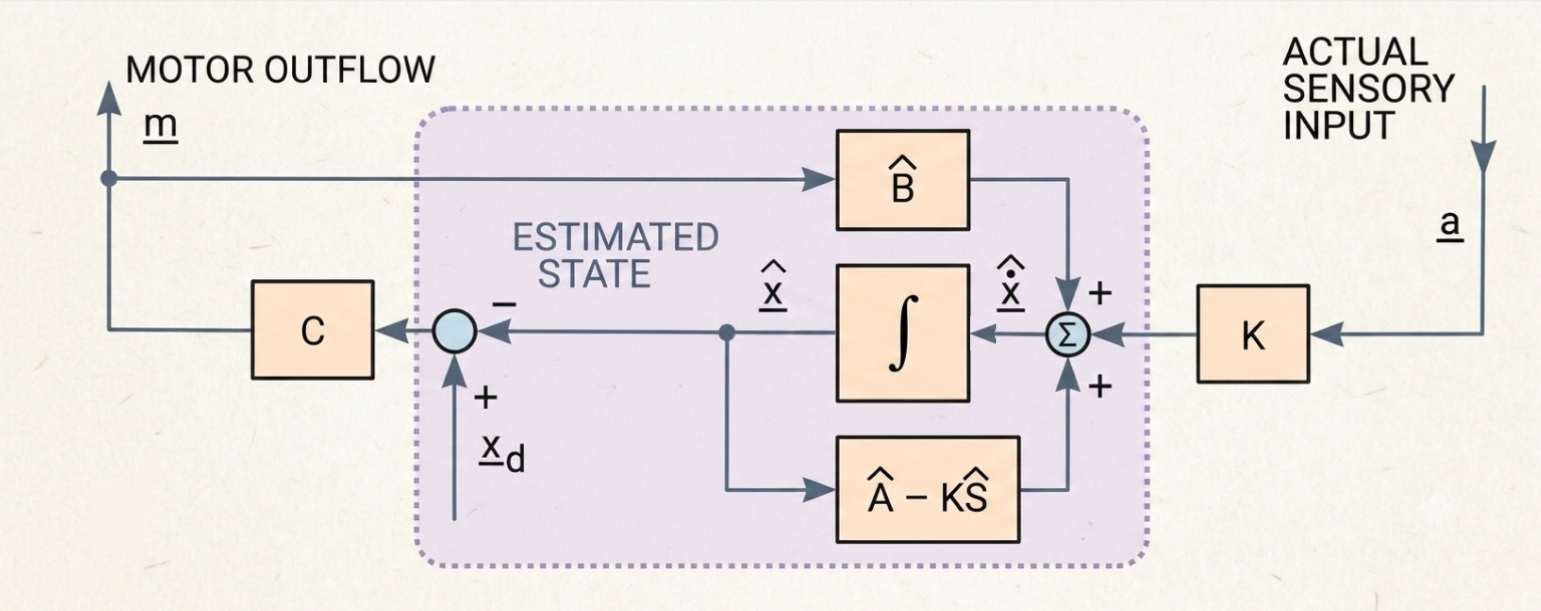
Closed-loop block diagram of Oman's observer-based sensory conflict model. Actual sensory input and motor outflow update the estimated state via gain K, which drives both the conflict signal and a controller generating corrective motor outflow.

=== Subjective vertical conflict model ===
Jelte E. Bos and Willem Bles proposed a more tractable, single-conflict reformulation of Oman's observer framework, in which motion sickness is related to a single scalar discrepancy between a sensed vertical $v$ (gravity as integrated from the visual, vestibular and somatosensory systems) and a subjective vertical $\hat{v}$ (the direction of gravity expected by the CNS on the basis of prior experience). The sensed vertical is obtained by low-pass filtering the gravito-inertial acceleration $a$ sensed by the otoliths:

$$v = \frac{1}{\tau s + 1}\,a$$

where $\tau$ is a low-pass time constant, empirically estimated at 5 seconds. The scalar conflict $c = v - \hat{v}$ is not linearly related to symptom severity, in fact sickness cannot exceed a ceiling, while small conflicts appear to be amplified, so it is passed through a saturating Hill-type nonlinearity:

$$h = \frac{(c/b)^n}{1 + (c/b)^n}$$

Here $b$ is an indifference point at which $h(b) = 0.5$, and the exponent $n$ sets the steepness of the transformation, ranging from a roughly logarithmic response ($n \approx 1$) to a sharp threshold (large $n$). The resulting signal is accumulated by a leaking, second-order integrator to yield the predicted motion sickness incidence (MSI), the percentage of exposed individuals expected to vomit within a given exposure period:

$$\mathrm{MSI} = \frac{P}{(\mu s + 1)^2}\,h$$

where $\mu$ is the cumulation time constant and $P$ is the maximum attainable percentage of susceptible individuals. With physiologically motivated parameter values, the model reproduces the empirically observed optimum in motion sickness incidence around 0.16–0.2 Hz for vertical oscillatory motion, arising from a phase lag approaching 180° between the sensed and subjective vertical at that frequency. The model has since been extended from a one-dimensional, vestibular-only formulation to six degrees of freedom, forming the basis of the "6DOF-SVC" model applied to carsickness prediction in road and autonomous vehicles.

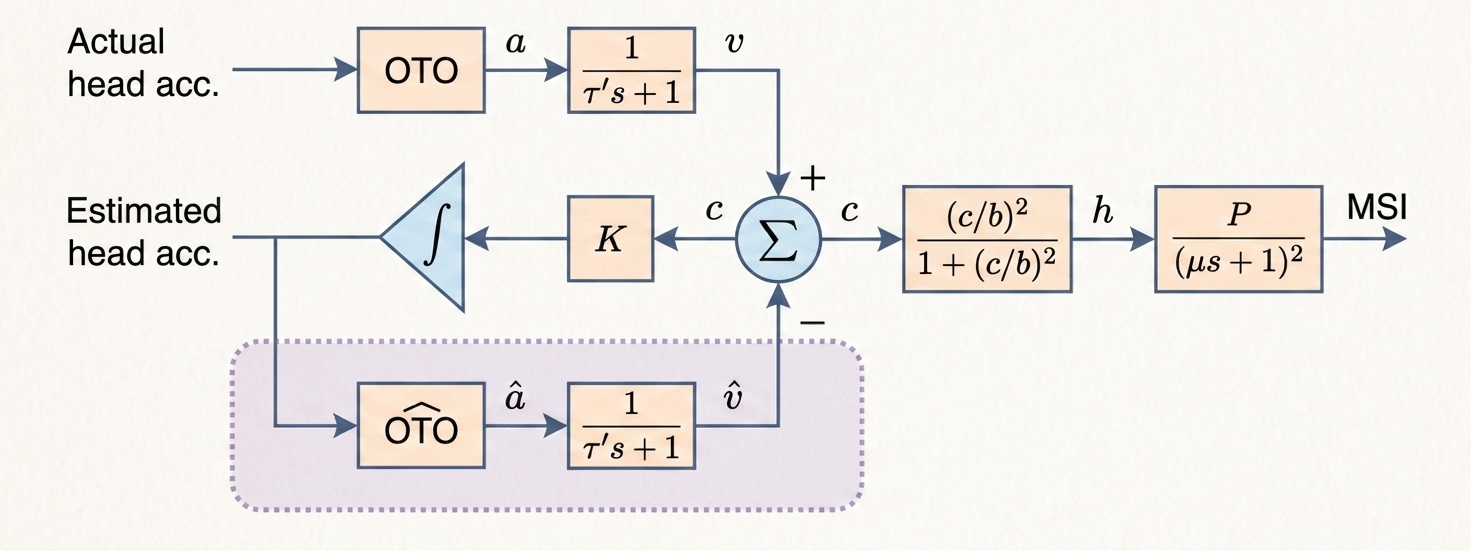
Based on Bos & Bles (1998), the SVC model predicts motion sickness by comparing actual head acceleration with the brain's estimated vertical. This conflict signal is processed via a saturating nonlinearity and accumulated over time.

=== Dynamic models of adaptation ===
Both the observer and SVC frameworks predict that repeated exposure to a given motion environment progressively reduces the conflict signal, since the internal model is continuously updated toward the statistics of the incoming sensory stream. Oman formalized this by defining sensory rearrangement as any situation in which the CNS's internal model ($\hat{A}, \hat{B}, \hat{S}$) diverges from the true system it is meant to represent ($A, B, S$), for example following exposure to vision-reversing prism spectacles, a motionless flight simulator after real flight, weightlessness, or a rotating-room environment. The trigger for updating the internal model is proposed to be a time-averaged, persistent increase in conflict magnitude, as distinguished from the transient conflict produced by an isolated external disturbance; because the CNS has no independent access to the true system parameters, active movement is proposed as the principal means by which this re-identification occurs. Empirically, the time course of adaptation is not uniform across all forms of rearrangement: adaptation to conventional spectacles occurs rapidly with practice, while adaptation to left–right visual reversal or to the vestibular rearrangement produced by a rotating room requires days to weeks, with some evidence that partially consolidated adaptation can be spontaneously lost during intervening periods of head immobilization.

== Experimental evidence ==
=== Galvanic vestibular stimulation studies ===
Galvanic vestibular stimulation (GVS), which is the application of weak electrical currents, has been used both to induce motion sickness experimentally and, more recently, to test sensory conflict theory's causal predictions directly. In a 2025 study, Aaron R. Allred, Aadhit R. Gopinath and Torin K. Clark used a computational approach to design GVS waveforms intended to either reduce or increase the vestibular sensory conflict predicted during passive physical translation, while holding all other sensory input constant. The conflict-reducing stimulation produced a 26% reduction in motion sickness development relative to baseline, while the conflict-increasing stimulation produced a 56% increase, providing direct causal evidence for the role of vestibular sensory conflict, as opposed to vestibular stimulation in general, in the genesis of motion sickness. This manipulability has also motivated interest in GVS-based oculo-vestibular recoupling as a countermeasure for cybersickness in virtual and extended reality.

=== Labyrinthine-defective subjects ===
One of the most consistent lines of evidence for sensory conflict theory comes from individuals with bilateral loss of labyrinthine function. Across a range of provocative environments, including zero-gravity parabolic flight, full-field visual rotation, and simulated storm conditions at sea, subjects with total bilateral vestibular loss are essentially immune to motion sickness, whereas normal control subjects are reliably made sick by the same stimuli. Note that labyrinthine-loss subjects also tend to be resistant to emetic drugs. This immunity is not absolute across all paradigms, however: some labyrinthine-defective subjects report sickness in response to purely visual roll stimuli, a finding used to argue that visual conflicts can, in principle, provoke sickness independent of the vestibular system, even though vestibular conflict remains dominant in most everyday situations.

=== Cross-coupled (Coriolis) stimulation ===
Cross-coupled, or Coriolis, stimulation is produced when a subject makes a head movement about one axis while the whole body is simultaneously rotating at constant velocity about a different axis. The resulting stimulus to the semicircular canals does not correspond to any pattern of head motion the vestibular system would encounter through pure, single-axis rotation, and is one of the most reliably nauseogenic laboratory stimuli identified; susceptibility is highly asymmetrically, and possibly bimodally, distributed in the population, with a small subset of individuals showing marked resistance. A mechanical analysis by Naoki Isu, Tadaaki Shimizu and Kazuhiro Sugata modelled the resulting canal stimulation by treating the semicircular canal endolymph as a rigid body and solving its equation of motion under cyclic angular stimulation. For a body rotating at constant angular velocity $\dot{\psi}_0$ while the head is oscillated sinusoidally with amplitude $\theta_A$ and frequency $f$, the mean-square sensation of rotation produced by the canal system was derived as:

$$\|\tilde{\omega}\|^2 = \dot{\psi}_0^2 \sin^2\!\left(\frac{\theta_A}{\sqrt{2}}\right) + \left(\sqrt{2}\,\pi \theta_A f\right)^2$$

When the body's angular velocity is substantially higher than $2\pi f$, the second term becomes negligible and the effective (root-mean-square) sensation reduces to:

$$\|\tilde{\omega}\|_{\text{eff}} \approx |\dot{\psi}_0|\,\frac{\theta_A}{\sqrt{2}}$$

This analysis predicts that the severity of nausea evoked by repetitive cross-coupled stimulation should be proportional to the product of body rotation velocity and head-oscillation amplitude, essentially independent of the oscillation frequency $f$ , a prediction consistent with earlier psychophysical magnitude-estimation experiments. Susceptibility to cross-coupled stimulation is also strongly modulated by background gravito-inertial force level: it is markedly reduced during brief periods of weightlessness and heightened under hypergravity relative to a normal 1 g baseline, a dependency that has informed the design of rotating artificial-gravity environments for long-duration spaceflight.

== Applications ==
=== Terrestrial motion sickness ===
Sensory conflict theory was originally developed to explain conventional forms of terrestrial motion sickness experienced during travel by car, train, ship, or aircraft. For example, passengers reading inside a moving vehicle receive relatively stable visual information from the reading material while the vestibular system detects acceleration and changes in direction, creating the sensory conflict associated with motion sickness.

The theory has also been used to explain why susceptibility varies according to seating position, visual conditions, and the ability to anticipate motion. Practical recommendations derived from the theory include maintaining a stable visual reference, looking toward the horizon, minimizing unnecessary head movements, and occupying positions where visual and vestibular cues are more closely aligned.

=== Space motion sickness ===
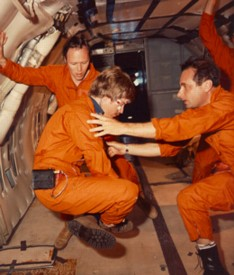
Space adaptation syndrome acclimation

Sensory conflict theory has been widely applied to explain space motion sickness, which affects many astronauts during the first days of exposure to microgravity. In orbit, the absence of a persistent gravitational reference alters vestibular signals generated by the otolith organs, while visual and proprioceptive information continues to indicate changes in body orientation and movement. The resulting mismatch between expected and actual sensory inputs is considered one of the principal mechanisms underlying space motion sickness.

The theory has also been used to explain the gradual adaptation observed during prolonged exposure to microgravity and the temporary re-adaptation required after returning to Earth's gravitational environment.

=== Simulator and virtual reality sickness ===
Following the development of sensory conflict theory, the framework was extended to explain symptoms experienced in simulators and immersive virtual reality systems. In these environments, users often perceive visually simulated self-motion while experiencing little or no corresponding vestibular stimulation, producing a sensory conflict that can result in nausea, dizziness, disorientation, and oculomotor discomfort.

The theory has influenced the design of flight simulators, driving simulators, and virtual reality systems by motivating techniques intended to reduce sensory discrepancies, including minimizing display latency, improving motion tracking, reducing visual instability, and carefully controlling visual motion cues.

=== Autonomous vehicles ===
The increasing development of autonomous vehicles has renewed interest in sensory conflict theory because occupants are expected to spend more time performing non-driving tasks such as reading or using electronic devices. Unlike drivers, passengers have limited control over vehicle motion and often receive visual information that is inconsistent with vestibular signals generated by acceleration, braking, and cornering.

Sensory conflict theory has therefore become one of the principal frameworks used to investigate motion sickness in automated vehicles. Research has explored vehicle motion planning, adaptive seating configurations, predictive visual displays, and active suspension systems designed to reduce sensory conflicts and improve passenger comfort.

== Criticisms and alternative theories ==
Since its formulation, sensory conflict theory has been extensively evaluated through experimental and theoretical research. Although it explains a broad range of motion sickness phenomena, several competing and complementary theories have been proposed to address observations that are not fully accounted for by sensory conflict alone.

=== Postural instability theory ===
In 1991, Gary E. Riccio and Thomas A. Stoffregen proposed the postural instability theory, arguing that motion sickness results primarily from prolonged instability in the control of posture rather than from sensory conflict itself. According to this hypothesis, motion sickness is preceded by an inability to maintain stable postural control under novel environmental conditions. Sensory conflict is regarded as one possible cause of postural instability rather than the direct cause of motion sickness. The theory predicts that prolonged postural instability should precede the onset of symptoms regardless of whether sensory conflict is present.

Postural instability theory has been investigated extensively, particularly in studies of simulator sickness and virtual reality. Experimental findings have provided mixed support for its predictions, with some studies reporting associations between postural instability and motion sickness, whereas others have found results more consistent with sensory conflict theory.

=== Evolutionary and toxin detection hypothesis ===
An alternative interpretation proposes that motion sickness represents an evolutionary adaptation associated with protection against neurotoxins. According to this hypothesis, conflicting sensory information may historically have indicated poisoning or neurological dysfunction, triggering nausea and vomiting as defensive responses.

The toxin detection hypothesis attempts to explain why sensory conflict produces gastrointestinal symptoms rather than merely perceptual discomfort. It is generally regarded as an evolutionary explanation for the physiological response to sensory conflict rather than an alternative mechanism for generating sensory conflict itself.

=== Limitations of sensory conflict as sole explanation ===
Despite its broad acceptance, sensory conflict theory does not explain every form of motion sickness. For example, symptoms can occasionally occur in situations where measurable sensory conflict appears to be minimal, while some individuals remain symptom-free despite experiencing substantial sensory discrepancies.

Individual susceptibility, cognitive expectations, anxiety, adaptation, and genetic factors have also been shown to influence the development and severity of motion sickness, suggesting that sensory conflict alone is insufficient to explain all observed variability.

Recent reviews describe sensory conflict as one of the principal mechanisms underlying motion sickness, while recognizing that additional physiological, cognitive, and behavioral factors contribute to symptom development and individual susceptibility.

=== Relationship to vection ===
Sensory conflict theory is closely related to the concept of vection, the illusory perception of self-motion induced by visual stimuli. Vection can occur in the absence of physical movement and is frequently investigated in studies of simulator sickness and virtual reality because visually induced self-motion may generate conflicts with vestibular and proprioceptive information.

Although vection and motion sickness often occur together, the relationship between the two phenomena is not straightforward. Experimental studies have shown that strong vection does not necessarily result in motion sickness, while motion sickness may develop in the absence of compelling vection. Consequently, vection is generally regarded as a contributing factor that may increase the likelihood of sensory conflict under certain conditions rather than as a direct predictor of motion sickness.

== See also ==
- Motion sickness
- Postural instability
- Simulator sickness
- Vection
- Vestibular system
