= Cyberjustice =

Incorporation of technology into the various protocols of a justice system

Cyberjustice is the incorporation of technology into the justice system, either through offering court services electronically or through the use of electronics within courtrooms or for other dispute resolution purposes. One of the most crucial goals of cyberjustice is increasing access to justice through both reducing the costs associated with administering justice as well as reducing the burden on the judges and the court system as a whole.

== Electronic justice services ==
Several electronic services are available in various court systems worldwide. For example, there are several electronic courtrooms that have integrated information and communications technologies such as video-conferencing, holographic evidence presentation technology or other communications technologies in addition to various systems or applications meant to aid in the conduction of the proceedings as well as the presentation of evidence. Additionally, throughout the entire process there is what is known as an electronic case management system available to the parties, their lawyers and judges, that allow them to keep track of what is taking place in the case through the Internet and permit them to file court documents and proceedings electronically or access information relative to the case. Furthermore, many jurisdictions allow for the discovery of documents to be done electronically through the use of electronic discovery systems. Once a case has been finalized and has become public information, these court records as well as judgements can be made available electronically to members of the public.

== Online dispute resolution ==
In addition to the use of technology for the purposes of litigation, the term cyberjustice also encompasses the domain of online dispute resolution, whose aim is to aid in the resolution of disputes prior to having to resort to the courts. Several mechanism for this type of electronic dispute resolution are available, namely cyber-negotiation, cyber-mediation and cyber-arbitration. The first can be classified as either assisted, which employs technologies for the purposes of communication, agenda development and adoption of solutions, or automated, where specialized software acts as a negotiator between the parties. For its part, cyber-mediation will often be an alternative where cyber-mediation was unfruitful and it involves a third party’s intervention to assist the parties in reaching an agreement. Finally, cyber-arbitration is different from the preceding two types of dispute resolution in that it is adjudicatory, and therefore must adhere to specified formal rules, as well as that parties never contact one another but rather communicate via an arbitrator.

== Cyberjustice initiatives ==
Cyberjustice has been integrated into the legal systems of several jurisdictions worldwide, including as of 2019 the European Union, Australia, the United States of America, and Canada. Several other international initiatives have been made.

=== The European Union ===
The European Union, for example has created the e-Justice Portal through which legislation case law and legal information may be accessed. The European Union also offers two other cyberjustice services, namely e-CODEX, which simplifies cross-border litigations by providing access to electronic delivery services, electronic signatures, electronic payments, electronic authentication and electronic documents, and e-CURIA, which is essentially just an e-filing system. Additionally, other countries within the European Union have incorporated certain technologies into their adjudication of justice, such as the United Kingdom, Italy and Spain. The United Kingdom runs Money Claim Online (MCOL), a service that allows a claim to be instituted online against two people at most who owe up to a maximum of £100,000 that they refuse to pay. Italy offers Trial Online, which is essentially both an electronic filing system and a case management system. Spain has passed laws whose aim is to regulate technology used in conjunction with the legal system and has ultimately resulted in the incorporation of technology in the legal system for the purposes of treating data and managing legal files, not the least of which is LexNET which enables the secure transfer of judicial data.

=== Australia ===
Australia offers e-filing services, online courtroom and online case management services, and is the first jurisdiction to have used a fully electronic courtroom for the hearing of a high-profile criminal case.

=== United States ===
The United States has several electronic courtrooms. For example, the McGlothlin Courtroom, located at the William and Mary College of Law, is one of the few to possess technology making it possible to publish court transcripts online in real time, and was the first to use holographic evidence display and immersive technology.

=== Canada ===
Several developments have been made in Canada for electronic access to court records and judgments and electronic case management systems, but its only fully electronic courtroom is on the premises of the University of Montreal. Known as the Cyberjustice Laboratory, this courtroom employs some of the most advanced courtroom technologies, such as audio-visual technology allowing for multi-videoconferencing, and the presentation of evidence in different forms, including 3D evidence via a digital retro-projector and the option of live annotation of evidence while it is being presented. One of the particular developments of the Cyberjustice Laboratory is the platform known as PARLe (Platform to Assist in the Resolution of Litigation electronically), which aids in the resolution of low-intensity disputes via the Internet.

=== International initiatives ===
Several international cyberjustice initiatives have been made. They include ICANN’s Uniform Domain-Name Dispute-Resolution Policy (UDRP), which was created to settle disputes regarding trademark infringement in domain names and issues arising out of cybersquatting and typosquatting. The ICANN Electronic Consumer Dispute Resolution (ECODIR) offered a free and voluntary dispute resolution service that began with negotiation and, if not successful, proceeded to mediation and ultimately the recommendation of a solution by the mediator; but this service has been terminated. The United Nations Commission on International Trade Law (UNCITRAL) was as of 2015 exploring the possibility of developing an online dispute resolution system to take care of cross-border disputes resulting from e-commerce.
