= Immersion (virtual reality) =

Perception of being physically present in a non-physical world

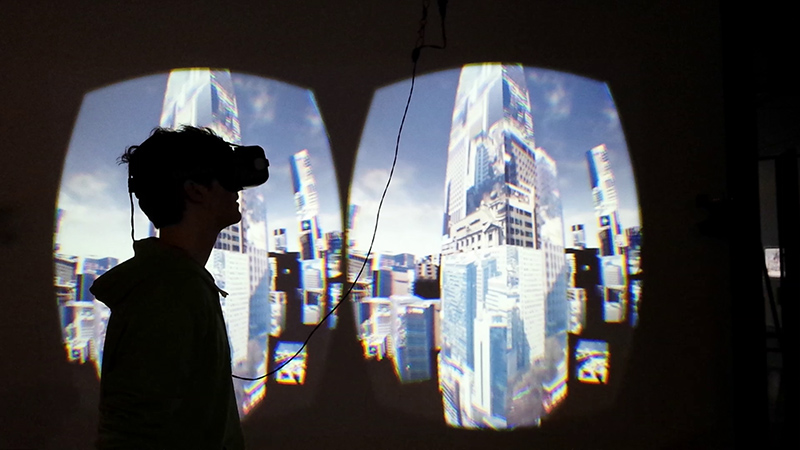
"10.000 moving cities", a telepresence-based installation artwork by Marc Lee

In virtual reality (VR), immersion is the perception of being physically present in a non-physical world. The perception is created by surrounding the user of the VR system in images, sound or other stimuli that provide an engrossing total environment.

== Etymology ==
The name is a metaphoric use of the experience of submersion applied to representation, fiction or simulation. Immersion can also be defined as the state of consciousness where a "visitor" (Maurice Benayoun) or "immersant" (Char Davies) has their awareness of their physical self transformed by being surrounded in an artificial environment. The term is used to describe partial or complete suspension of disbelief, enabling action or reaction to stimulations encountered in a virtual or artistic environment. The greater the suspension of disbelief, the greater the degree of presence achieved.

== Types ==
According to Ernest W. Adams, immersion can be separated into three main categories:

- Tactical immersion: Tactical immersion is experienced when performing tactile operations that involve skill. Players feel "in the zone" while perfecting actions that result in success.
- Strategic immersion: Strategic immersion is more cerebral, and is associated with mental challenge. Chess players experience strategic immersion when choosing a correct solution among a broad array of possibilities.
- Narrative immersion: Narrative immersion occurs when players become invested in a story, and is similar to what is experienced while reading a book or watching a movie.

Staffan Björk and Jussi Holopainen, in Patterns In Game Design, divide immersion into similar categories, but call them sensory-motoric immersion, cognitive immersion and emotional immersion, respectively. In addition to these, they add a new category: spatial immersion, which occurs when a player feels the simulated world is perceptually convincing. The player feels that he or she is really "there" and that a simulated world looks and feels "real".

== Presence ==
Presence, a term derived from the shortening of the original "telepresence", is a phenomenon enabling people to interact with and feel connected to the world outside their physical bodies via technology. It is defined as a person's subjective sensation of being there in a scene depicted by a medium, usually virtual in nature.

Most designers focus on the technology used to create a high-fidelity virtual environment; however, the human factors involved in achieving a state of presence must be taken into account as well. It is the subjective perception, although generated by and/or filtered through human-made technology, that ultimately determines the successful attainment of presence.

Virtual reality glasses can produce a visceral feeling of being in a simulated world, a form of spatial immersion called Presence. According to Oculus VR, the technology requirements to achieve this visceral reaction are low-latency and precise tracking of movements.

Michael Abrash gave a talk on VR at Steam Dev Days in 2014. According to the VR research team at Valve, all of the following are needed to establish presence.

- A wide field of view (80 degrees or better)
- Adequate resolution (1080p or better)
- Low pixel persistence (3 ms or less)
- A high enough refresh rate (>60 Hz, 95 Hz is enough but less may be adequate)
- Global display where all pixels are illuminated simultaneously (rolling display may work with eye tracking.)
- Optics (at most two lenses per eye with trade-offs, ideal optics not practical using current technology)
- Optical calibration
- Rock-solid tracking – translation with millimeter accuracy or better, orientation with quarter degree accuracy or better, and volume of 1.5 meter or more on a side
- Low latency (20 ms motion to last photon, 25 ms may be good enough)

== Immersive media and technology ==
Immersive media is a term applied to a group of concepts, variously defined, which may have application in fields such as engineering, media, healthcare, education and retail. Concepts included in immersive media are:

- Virtual reality (VR)
- Augmented reality (AR)
- Mixed reality (MR)
- Extended reality (XR)
- Metaverse
- Spatial computing
- 3D content

=== Technology ===
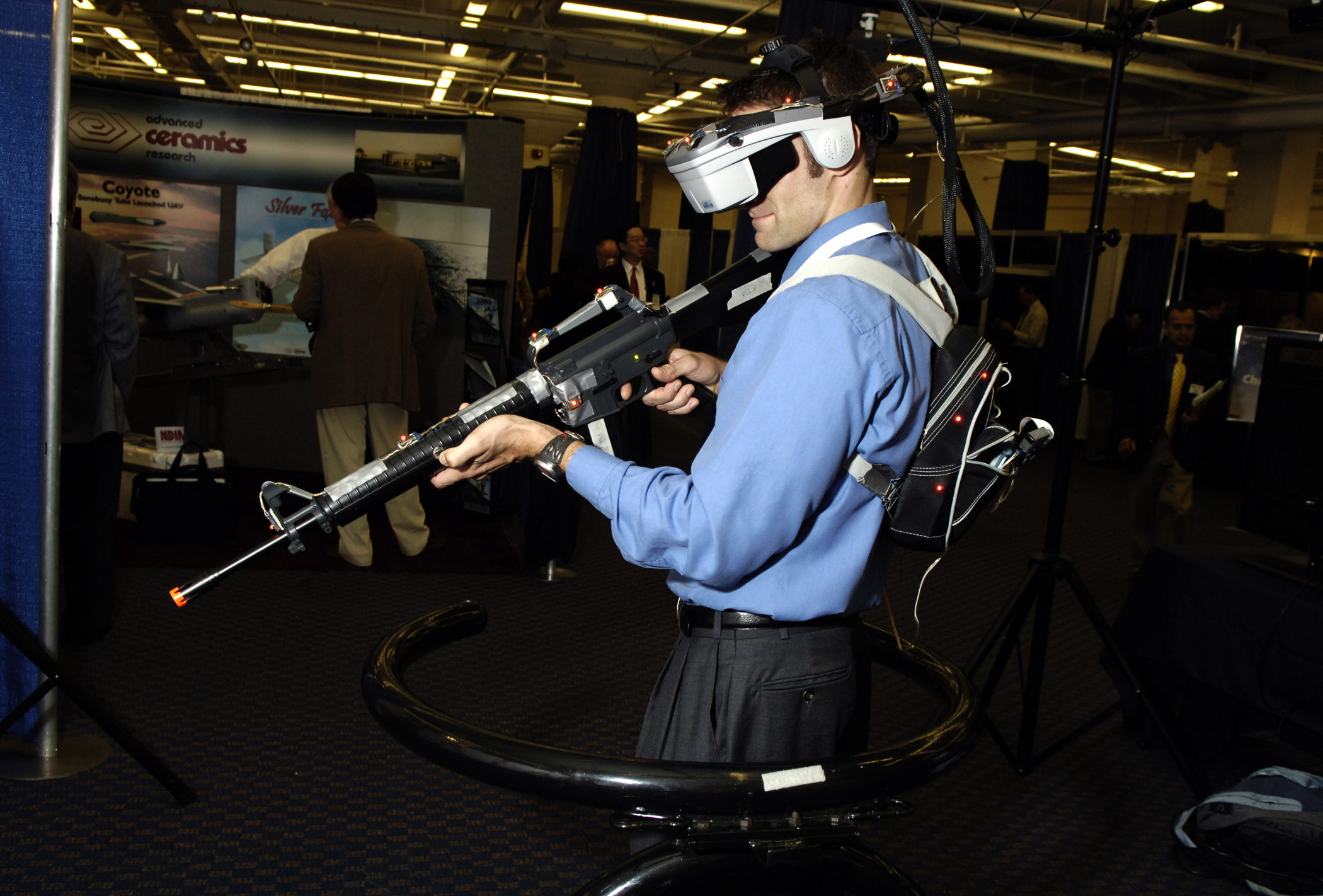
Engineer research psychologist from the Naval Research Laboratory (NRL) demonstrates the Infantry Immersive Trainer (IIT), one of several Virtual Training Environment projects (VIRTE).

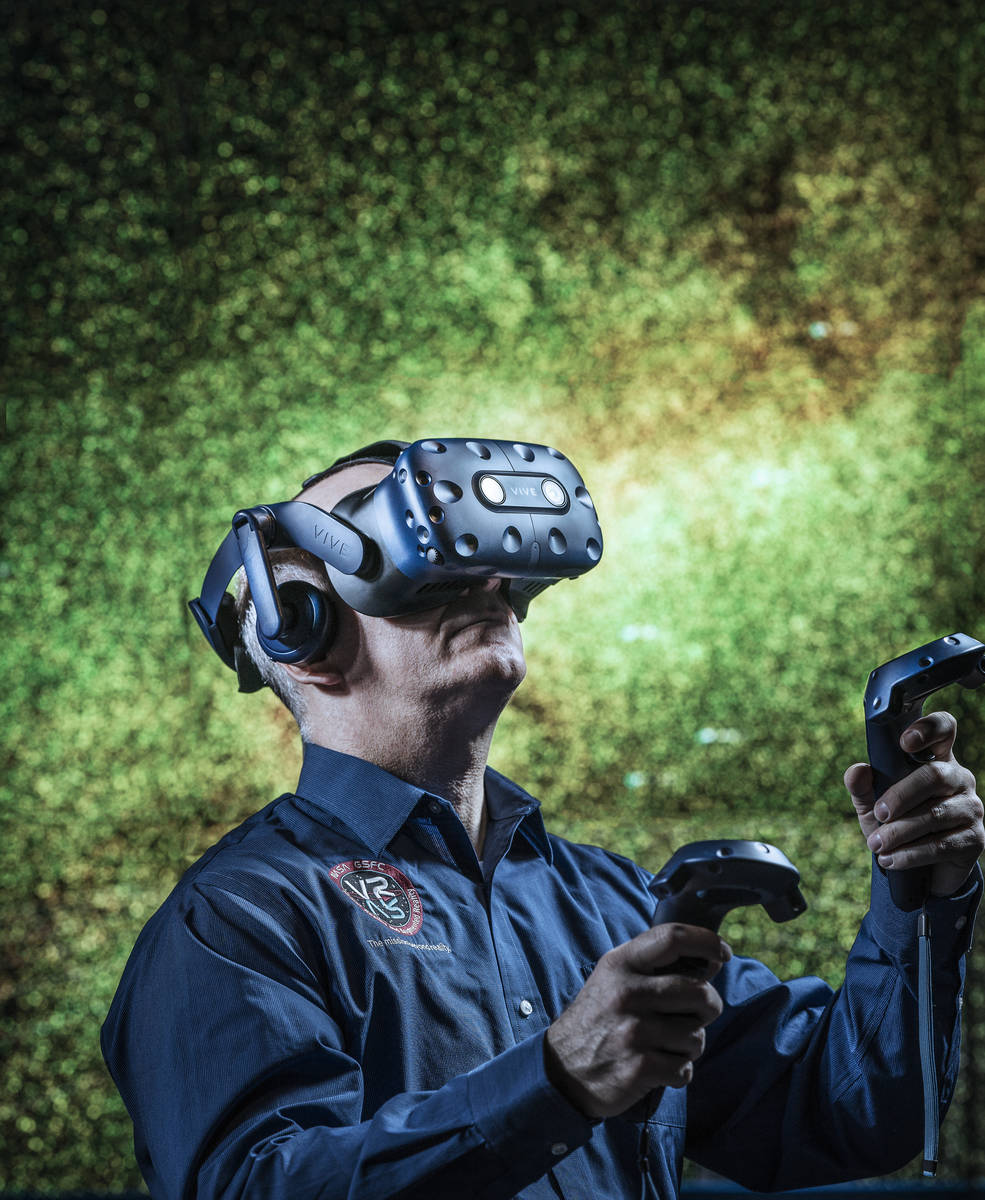
A version of modern virtual reality goggles that would be used today

Immersive virtual reality is a technology that creates for the user an immersive generated world inside the computer, giving the impression to the user that they have "stepped inside" the synthetic world. This is achieved by either using the technologies of Head-Mounted Display (HMD) or multiple projections. HMD allows VR to be projected right in front of the eyes and allows users to focus on it without any distraction. The earliest attempts at developing immersive technology date back to the 1800s. Without these early attempts, the world of immersive technology would never have reached its advanced technological state we have today. The many elements that surround the realm of immersive technology all come together in different ways to create different types of immersive technology including virtual reality and pervasive gaming.

==== Origin ====
One of the first devices that was designed to look like and function as a virtual reality headset was called a stereoscope. It was invented in the 1830s during the early days of photography, and it used a slightly different image in each eye to create a kind of 3D effect. Although as photography continued to develop in the late 1800s, stereoscopes became more and more obsolete. Immersive technology became more available to the people in 1957 when Morton Heilig invented the Sensorama cinematic experience that included speakers, fans, smell generators, and a vibrating chair to immerse the viewer in the movie. When one imagines the VR headsets they see today, they must give credit to The Sword of Damocles which was invented in 1968 and allowed users to connect their VR headsets to a computer rather than a camera. In 1991, Sega launched the Sega VR headset which was made for arcade/home use, but only the arcade version was released due to technical difficulties. Augmented reality began to rapidly develop within the 1990s when Louis Rosenberg created Virtual Fixtures, which was the first fully immersive augmented reality system, used for the Air Force. The invention enhanced operator performance of manual tasks in remote locations by using two robot controls in an exoskeleton. The first introduction of augmented reality displayed to a live audience was in 1998, when the NFL first displayed a virtual yellow line to represent the line of scrimmage/first down. In 1999, Hirokazu Kato developed the ARToolkit, which was an open source library for the development of AR applications. This allowed people to experiment with AR and release new and improved applications. Later, in 2009 Esquire's magazine was the first to use a QR code on the front of their magazine to provide additional content. Once The Oculus came out in 2012, it revolutionized virtual reality and eventually raised 2.4 million dollars and began releasing their pre-production models to developers. Facebook purchased Oculus for 2 billion dollars in 2014, which showed the world the upward trajectory of VR. In 2013, Google announced their plans to develop their first AR headset, Google Glass. The production stopped in 2015 due to privacy concerns, but relaunched in 2017 exclusively for the enterprise. In 2016, Pokémon Go took the world by storm and became one of the most downloaded apps of all time. It was the first augmented reality game that was accessible through ones phone.

==== Elements of immersive technology ====
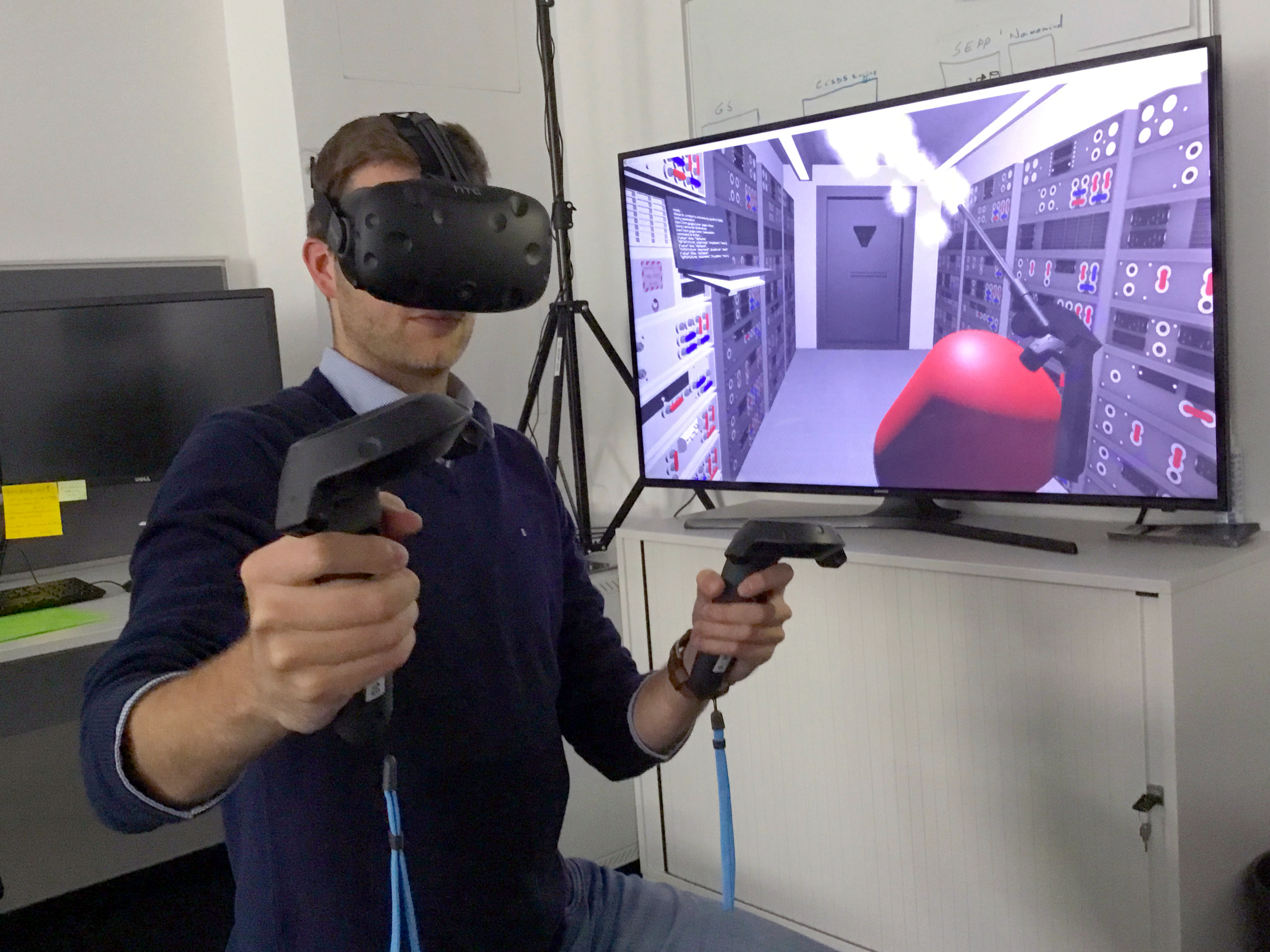
Man uses immersive technology headset and hand controls to complete the stage of a virtual reality video game.

A full immersive technology experience happens when all elements of sight, sound, and touch come together. A true immersive experience needs to be done with either virtual reality or augmented reality, as these two types utilize all of these elements. Interactivity and connectivity is the entire focus of immersive technology. It is not placing someone in an entirely different environment, it is when they are virtually presented with a new environment and are given the opportunity to learn how to optimally live and interact with it.

==== Types of immersive technology ====
Virtual reality is the primary source of immersive technology that allows the user to be completely immersed in a fully digital environment that replicates another reality. Users must use a headset, hand controls, and headphones in order to have a fully immersive experience where one is able to utilize movements/reflects. There are also pervasive games which utilize real world locations within game play. This is when the user's interaction on a virtual game lead to them interacting in real life. Some of these games may require users to physically meet up in order to complete stages. The gaming world has developed a series of popular virtual reality video games, such as Vader Immortal, Trover Saves the Universe, and No Man's Sky. The world of immersive technology has many facets that will continue to develop/expand over time.

=== Immersive technology today ===
Immersive technology has grown immensely in the past few decades, and is continuing to progress. VR has even been described as the learning aid of the 21st century. Head mounted displays (HMD) is what allows users to get the full immersive experience. The HMD market is expected to be worth over US$25 billion by the year 2022. The technologies of VR and AR received a boost in attention when Mark Zuckerberg, founder/creator of Facebook, bought Oculus for US$2 billion in 2014. Recently, the Oculus Quest was released, which is wireless and allows users to move more freely. It costs around US$400 which is around the same price as the previous generation headsets with cables. Other massive corporations such as Sony, Samsung, and HTC are also making huge investments into VR/AR. In regards to education, there are currently many researchers who are exploring the benefits and applications of virtual reality in the classroom. However, there is little systemic work that currently exists regarding how researchers have applied immersive VR for higher education purposes using HMDs. The most popular use of immersive technology comes in the world of video games. Completely immersing users into their favorite game, HMDs have allowed individuals to experience the realm of video games in an entirely new light. Current video games such as Star Wars: Squadron, Half-Life: Alyx, and No Man's Sky are giving users the ability to experience every aspect of the digital world in their game. While there is still a lot to learn about immersive technology and what it has to offer, it has come an entirely long way from its beginnings in the early 1800s.

=== Components ===
==== Perception ====
Hardware technologies are developed to stimulate one or more of the senses to create perceptually real sensations. Some vision technologies are 3D displays, fulldomes, head-mounted displays, and holography. Some auditory technologies are 3D audio effects, high-resolution audio, and surround sound. Haptic technology simulates tactile responses.

==== Interaction ====
Various technologies provide the ability to interact and communicate with the virtual environment, including brain-computer interfaces, gesture recognition, omnidirectional treadmills, and speech recognition.

==== Software ====
Software interacts with the hardware technology to render the virtual environment and process the user input to provide dynamic, real-time response. To achieve this, software often integrates components of artificial intelligence and virtual worlds. This is done differently depending on the technology and environment; Whether the software needs to create a fully immersive environment or display a projection on the already existing environment the user is looking at.

=== Research and development ===
Many universities have programs that research and develop immersive technology. Examples are Stanford's Virtual Human Interaction Lab, USC's Computer Graphics and Immersive Technologies Lab, Iowa State Virtual Reality Applications Center, University of Buffalo's VR Lab, Teesside University's Intelligent Virtual Environments Lab, Liverpool John Moores University's Immersive Story Lab, University of Michigan Ann Arbor, Oklahoma State University and the University of Southern California. All of these universities and more are researching the advancement of the technology along with the different uses that VR could be applied to.

As well universities the video game industry has received a massive boost from immersive technology specifically Augmented reality. The company Epic games known for their popular game Fortnite generated 1.25 billion dollars in a round of investing in 2018 as they have a leading 3D development platform for AR apps. The U.S. Government requests information for immersive technology development and funds specific projects. This is for implementation in government branches in the future.

=== Application ===
Immersive technology is applied in several areas, including retail and e-commerce, the adult industry, art, entertainment and video games and interactive storytelling, military, education, and medicine. It is also growing in the Non-profit industry in fields such as disaster relief and conservation due to its ability to put a user in a situation that would elicit more of a real-world experience than just a picture giving them a stronger emotional connection to the situation they would be viewing. As immersive technology becomes more mainstream, it will likely pervade other industries. Also with the legalization of cannabis happening worldwide, the cannabis industry has seen a large growth in the immersive technology market to allow virtual tours of their facilities to engage potential customers and investors.

=== Concerns and ethics ===
The potential perils of immersive technology have often been portrayed in science fiction and entertainment. Movies such as eXistenZ, The Matrix, and the short film Play by David Kaplan and Eric Zimmerman, raise questions about what may happen if we are unable to distinguish the physical world from the digital world.

There has been debate on the issue of virtual crime, and whether it is ethical to permit illegal behavior such as rape in a simulated environment.

== Immersive art exhibits ==
Immersive art exhibits have been held in many regions and venues. Some exhibitions of works by Vincent Van Gogh occurred in 2021 in the United States. Most of these experiences involve visitors moving through multiple rooms, with walls, and occasionally floors or ceilings, covered in moving projections of Van Gogh's works. The projections include sketches, drawings, and paintings, presented in a 360-degree, floor-to-ceiling digital format. The works are typically accompanied by music set to pair with them. Some exhibits also use sensory tools like aromas of cedar, cypress, lemon, or nutmeg to help visitors feel more immersed with the works. Some events involve virtual reality headsets that take visitors through the artist's experiences.

As of the 2020s, many major cities around the world had a number of varied immersive art exhibits occurring at various venues. Arte Museum is a South Korean immersive art franchise created by the Seoul-based digital design firm d'strict. The first location opened in the Aewol district of Jeju City, South Korea, in 2020. The franchise has since expanded to multiple cities in South Korea and abroad. In New York City, the Arte Museum opened in 2025 with numerous exhibits.

== Immersive virtual reality ==
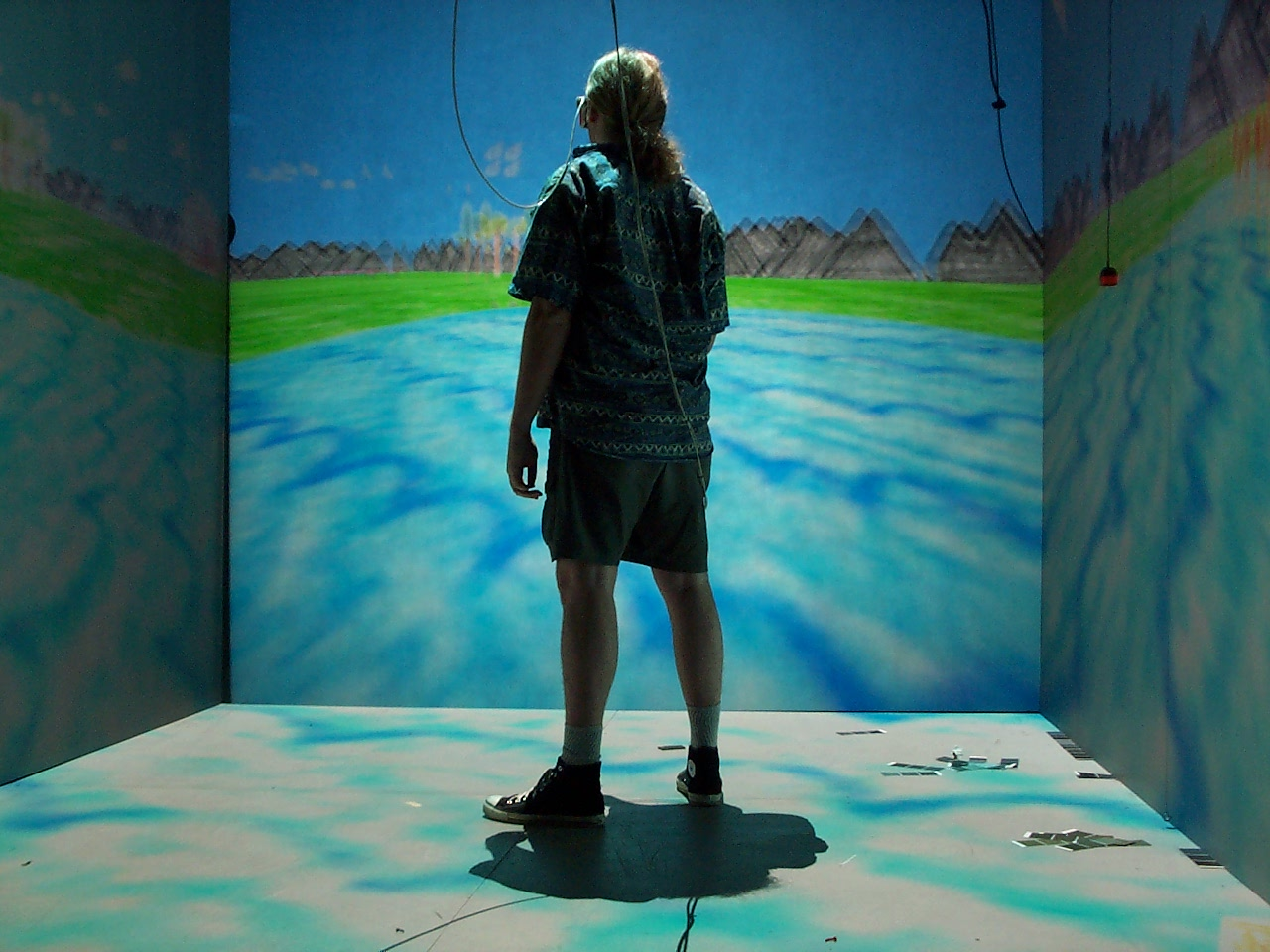
A Cave Automatic Virtual Environment (CAVE) system

Immersive virtual reality is a hypothetical future technology that exists today as virtual reality art projects, for the most part. It consists of immersion in an artificial environment where the user feels just as immersed as they usually feel in everyday life.

=== Direct interaction of the nervous system ===
The most considered method would be to induce the sensations that made up the virtual reality in the nervous system directly. In functionalism/conventional biology we interact with everyday life through the nervous system. Thus we receive all input from all the senses as nerve impulses. It gives your neurons a feeling of heightened sensation. It would involve the user receiving inputs as artificially stimulated nerve impulses, the system would receive the CNS outputs (natural nerve impulses) and process them allowing the user to interact with the virtual reality. Natural impulses between the body and central nervous system would need to be prevented. This could be done by blocking out natural impulses using nanorobots which attach themselves to the brain wiring, whilst receiving the digital impulses of which describe the virtual world, which could then be sent into the wiring of the brain. A feedback system between the user and the computer which stores the information would also be needed. Considering how much information would be required for such a system, it is likely that it would be based on hypothetical forms of computer technology.

=== Requirements ===
Understanding of the nervous system

A comprehensive understanding of which nerve impulses correspond to which sensations, and which motor impulses correspond to which muscle contractions will be required. This will allow the correct sensations in the user, and actions in the virtual reality to occur. The Blue Brain Project is a research project with the idea of understanding how the brain works by building very large scale computer models.

== Immersive digital environments ==
An immersive digital environment is an artificial, interactive, computer-created scene or "world" within which a user can immerse themselves.

Immersive digital environments could be thought of as synonymous with virtual reality, but without the implication that actual "reality" is being simulated. An immersive digital environment could be a model of reality, but it could also be a complete fantasy user interface or abstraction, as long as the user of the environment is immersed within it. The definition of immersion is wide and variable, but here it is assumed to mean simply that the user feels like they are part of the simulated "universe". The success with which an immersive digital environment can actually immerse the user is dependent on many factors such as believable 3D computer graphics, surround sound, interactive user-input and other factors such as simplicity, functionality and potential for enjoyment. New technologies are currently under development which claim to bring realistic environmental effects to the players' environment – effects like wind, seat vibration and ambient lighting.

=== Perception ===
To create a sense of full immersion, the 5 senses (sight, sound, touch, smell, taste) must perceive the digital environment to be physically real. Immersive technology can perceptually fool the senses through:

- Panoramic 3D displays (visual)
- Surround sound acoustics (auditory)
- Haptics and force feedback (tactile)
- Smell replication (olfactory)
- Taste replication (gustation)

=== Interaction ===
Once the senses reach a sufficient belief that the digital environment is real (it is interaction and involvement which can never be real), the user must then be able to interact with the environment in a natural, intuitive manner. Various immersive technologies such as gestural controls, motion tracking, and computer vision respond to the user's actions and movements. Brain control interfaces (BCI) respond to the user's brainwave activity.

=== Examples and applications ===
Training and rehearsal simulations run the gamut from part task procedural training (often buttonology, for example: which button do you push to deploy a refueling boom) through situational simulation (such as crisis response or convoy driver training) to full motion simulations which train pilots or soldiers and law enforcement in scenarios that are too dangerous to train in actual equipment using live ordinance.

Video games from simple arcade to massively multiplayer online game and training programs such as flight and driving simulators. Entertainment environments such as motion simulators that immerse the riders/players in a virtual digital environment enhanced by motion, visual and aural cues. Reality simulators, such as one of the Virunga Mountains in Rwanda that takes you on a trip through the jungle to meet a tribe of mountain gorillas. Or training versions such as one which simulates taking a ride through human arteries and the heart to witness the buildup of plaque and thus learn about cholesterol and health.

In parallel with scientists, artists like Knowbotic Research, Donna Cox, Rebecca Allen, Robbie Cooper, Maurice Benayoun, Char Davies, and Jeffrey Shaw use the potential of immersive virtual reality to create physiologic or symbolic experiences and situations.

Other examples of immersion technology include physical environment / immersive space with surrounding digital projections and sound such as the CAVE, and the use of virtual reality headsets for viewing movies, with head-tracking and computer control of the image presented, so that the viewer appears to be inside the scene. Additionally, immersion technology can include audio with head-tracking and precise directivity of sound, such as the Nokia OZO technology. The next generation is VIRTSIM, which achieves total immersion through motion capture and wireless head mounted displays for teams of up to thirteen immersants enabling natural movement through space and interaction in both the virtual and physical space simultaneously.

==== Use in medical care ====
New fields of studies linked to immersive virtual reality emerge every day. Researchers see a great potential in virtual reality tests serving as complementary interview methods in psychiatric care. Immersive virtual reality have in studies also been used as an educational tool in which the visualization of psychotic states have been used to get increased understanding of patients with similar symptoms. New treatment methods are available for schizophrenia and other newly developed research areas where immersive virtual reality is expected to achieve melioration is in education of surgical procedures, rehabilitation program from injuries and surgeries and reduction of phantom limb pain.

==== Applications in the built environment ====
In the domain of architectural design and building science, immersive virtual environments are adopted to facilitate architects and building engineers to enhance the design process through assimilating their sense of scale, depth, and spatial awareness. Such platforms integrate the use of virtual reality models and mixed reality technologies in various functions of building science research, construction operations, personnel training, end-user surveys, performance simulations and building information modeling visualization. Head-mounted displays (with both 3 degrees of freedom and 6 degrees of freedom systems) and CAVE platforms are used for spatial visualization and building information modeling (BIM) navigations for different design and evaluation purposes. Clients, architects and building owners use derived applications from game engines to navigate 1:1 scale BIM models, allowing a virtual walkthrough experience of future buildings. For such use cases, the performance improvement of space navigation between virtual reality headsets and 2D desktop screens has been investigated in various studies, with some suggesting significant improvement in virtual reality headsets while others indicate no significant difference. Architects and building engineers can also use immersive design tools to model various building elements in virtual reality CAD interfaces, and apply property modifications to building information modeling (BIM) files through such environments.

In the building construction phase, immersive environments are used to improve site preparations, on site communication and collaboration of team members, safety and logistics. For training of construction workers, virtual environments have shown to be highly effective in skill transfer with studies showing similar performance results to training in real environments. Moreover, virtual platforms are also used in the operation phase of buildings to interact and visualize data with Internet of Things (IoT) devices available in buildings, process improvement and also resource management.

Occupant and end-user studies are performed through immersive environments. Virtual immersive platforms engage future occupants in the building design process by providing a sense of presence to users with integrating pre-construction mock-ups and BIM models for the evaluation of alternative design options in the building model in a timely and cost efficient manner. Studies conducting human experiments have shown users perform similarly in daily office activities (object identification, reading speed and comprehension) within immersive virtual environments and benchmarked physical environments. In the field of lighting, virtual reality headsets have been used investigate the influence of façade patterns on the perceptual impressions and satisfaction of a simulated daylit space. Moreover, artificial lighting studies have implemented immersive virtual environments to evaluate end-users lighting preferences of simulated virtual scenes with the controlling of the blinds and artificial lights in the virtual environment.

For structural engineering and analysis, immersive environments enable the user to focus on structural investigations without getting too distracted to operate and navigate the simulation tool. Virtual and augmented reality applications have been designed for finite element analysis of shell structures. Using stylus and data gloves as input devices, the user can create, modify mesh, and specify boundary conditions. For a simple geometry, real-time color-coded results are obtained by changing loads on the model. Studies have used artificial neural networks (ANN) or approximation methods to achieve real-time interaction for the complex geometry, and to simulate its impact via haptic gloves. Large scale structures and bridge simulation have also been achieved in immersive virtual environments. The user can move the loads acting on the bridge, and finite element analysis results are updated immediately using an approximate module.

== Detrimental effects ==
Simulation sickness, or simulator sickness, is a condition where a person exhibits symptoms similar to motion sickness caused by playing simulation games.

Motion sickness due to virtual reality is very similar to simulation sickness and motion sickness due to films. In virtual reality, however, the effect is made more acute as all external reference points are blocked from vision, the simulated images are three-dimensional and in some cases stereo sound that may also give a sense of motion. Studies have shown that exposure to rotational motions in a virtual environment can cause significant increases in nausea and other symptoms of motion sickness.

Other behavioural changes such as stress, addiction, isolation and mood changes are also discussed to be side-effects caused by immersive virtual reality.

== See also ==
- Hyperreality – Term for cultural process of shifting ideas of reality
- Interactive art – Creative works that involve viewer input
- Metaverse – Collective 3D virtual shared space
- Narrative transportation – Psychological theory
- Pancake lens – Term for a thin, flat camera lens
- PlayStation VR2 – Virtual reality headset developed by Sony Interactive Entertainment
- Screen-door effect – Visual artifact of displays
- Simulated reality – Concept of a false version of reality
- Spatial computing – Computing paradigm emphasizing 3D spatial interaction with technology
- Sword Art Online – Japanese light novel series and its adaptations
- Uncanny valley – Hypothesis that human replicas elicit revulsion
- Vergence-accommodation conflict – Visual and perceptual phenomenon
- Virtual art – Art involving virtual environments and interactive technologies
- Virtual reality sickness – Nausea caused by exposure to a VR environment
