= Health effects of 3D =

Effects of 3D graphics on human health

The health effects of 3D are the aspects in which the human body is altered after the exposure of three-dimensional (3D) graphics. These health effects typically only occur when viewing stereoscopic, autostereoscopic, and multiscopic displays. Newer types of 3D displays like light field or holographic displays do not cause the same health effects. The viewing of 3D stereoscopic stimuli can cause symptoms related to vision disorders that the individual already had, as a person with a healthy binocular vision shouldn't experience any side effects under three-dimensional exposure.

An increase in vergence-accommodation conflict occurs as the eye changes its movement patterns to focus on the position of objects recreated by stereoscopy. One may counter vergence-accommodation conflict when seeing a 3D movie or using a near-eye display system (e.g., augmented reality (AR) and virtual reality (VR)) adapting stereoscopic stimuli without registration function.

Adverse health effects, such as oculomotor symptoms, motor disorientation, and visual fatigue on viewers after three-dimensional exposure, result from the mismatch between the visual, the proprioceptive and the vestibular stimuli.

== 3D on evaluating eye health ==
Nowadays a great array of optometrists have opted to use 3D presentations and therapies to measure eyesight accuracy. This is due to the test's requirement for the eyes to work coordinated with the brain in order to render a 3D image.

According to the American Optometric Association there are approximately from 3 to 9 million people with binocular vision problems. If an individual lacks binocular vision, then a 3D perspective is impossible and simply unachievable. Watching shows and/or movies in 3D can help to point out those problems earlier, working as a screening check and noticing the lack of binocular vision so that a proper treatment can be applied. These problems may also reflect upon a fundamental vision-related problem not entirely linked to binocular vision issues. Symptoms sign that an eye condition is present, which may be:

=== Refractive problems ===
Myopia (nearsightedness), hyperopia (farsightedness) or astigmatism.

=== Strabismus ===
Strabismus is the lack of binocular vision. Eyes aren't properly aligned and so the input the brain has to render is in mismatch, preventing correct 3D stereoscopic perception from happening.

=== Amblyopia ===
Amblyopia, commonly known as "lazy eye". It occurs when a single eye sends input to the brain while ignoring inputs from the other eye. This results in monocular vision.

=== Convergence insufficiency ===
Disorder in which the subject finds it difficult to keep both eyes aligned with each other, causing asthenopia.

=== Accommodation Issues ===
When the inability to focus objects from varying distances is presented. Headaches, blurred vision and general vision discomfort are presented in subjects who have this condition and are exposed to 3D effects.

=== Nausea and/or dizziness ===
Seeing 3D movies can increase rating of symptoms of nausea, oculomotor and disorientation, especially in women with susceptible visual-vestibular system. This is caused by a "disagreement" between the vestibular system and the visual input, causing that the body interprets it is moving, creating a contradiction with the vestibular system. This effect is also noticeable with 2D movies shown in a theater with a large field of view, like in an IMAX dome theater or planetarium.

== Diagnosis ==
An optometrist should be consulted to check the eyesight if:

- Headaches, eyestrain, dizziness, or nausea after watching 3D films are experienced.
- You have difficulty adjusting your vision.

== 3D and children ==
Basic binocularity is already developed when the child is from 6 to 12 months old. Vision is well formed when reaching the age of 3 years, by this moment children can watch three-dimensional graphics without involving risks to their eye health. In case of presenting Photosensitive epilepsy (PSE), precautions should be taken. The risk of an episode is present with 3D viewing as with 2D viewing. Although the risks are present in both cases there is no evidence, whatsoever that points out that 3D factors in visual effects have a greater influence on inducing PSE.

It is rather important to emphasize the great benefits of regular eye exams. As of 2012, and according to the National Health Interview Survey, only an alarming percentage of 7% attend to an eye examination in the 12 months prior to the beginning of first grade.
