= Third-person (video games) =

Graphical perspective in video games

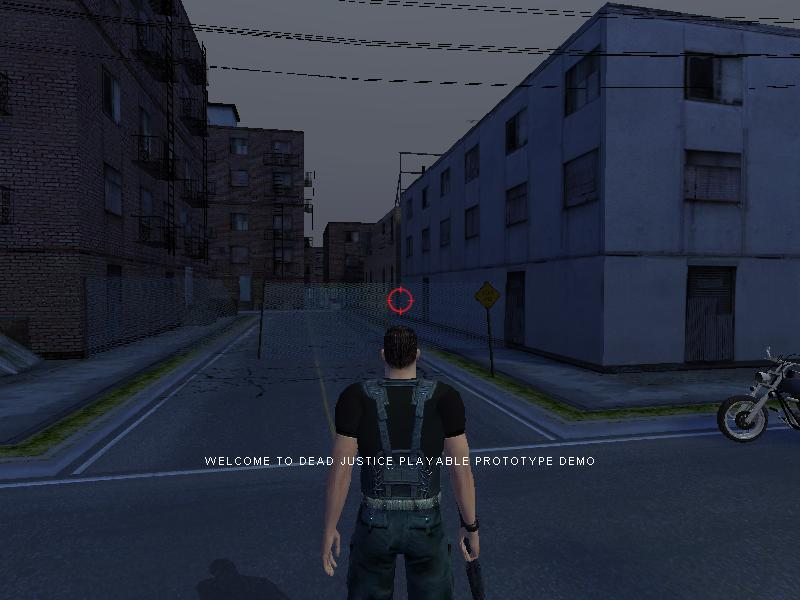
Screenshot from the third-person shooter Dead Justice

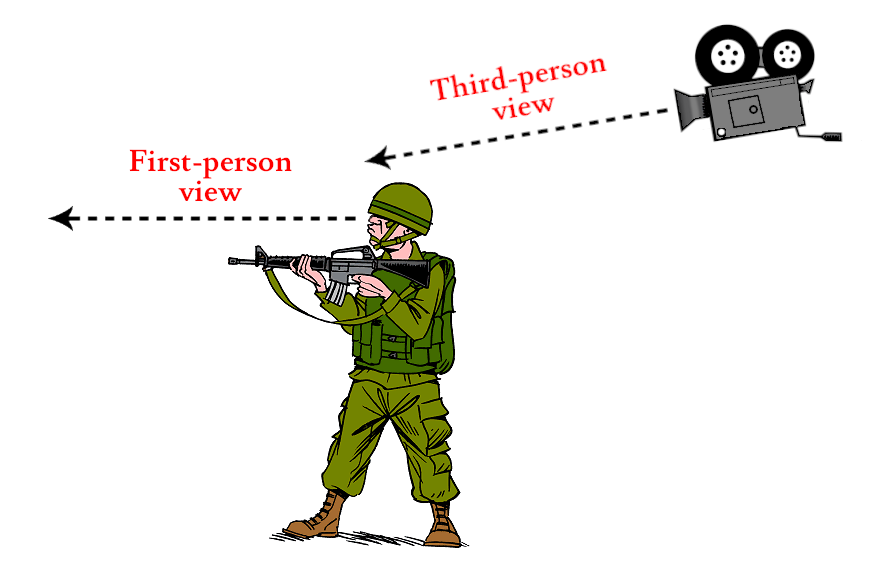
An illustration of a protagonist whom a player controls, a soldier, and a tracking camera hovering just behind, slightly above, and slightly facing down towards that character

In video games, third-person (also spelled third person) is a graphical perspective rendered from a fixed distance behind and slightly above the player character. This viewpoint allows players to see a more strongly characterized avatar and is most common in action games and action adventure games. Games with this perspective often make use of positional audio, where the volume of ambient sounds varies depending on the position of the avatar.

== Camera systems ==
There are several types of camera systems in games that use a third-person view: the "tracking camera systems" in which the camera simply follows the player's character; the "fixed camera systems" in which the camera positions are set during the game creation; the "interactive camera systems" that are under the player's control; and the "over-the-shoulder" camera system.

Simple tracking cameras follow the characters from behind, and were common in early 3D games such as Crash Bandicoot (1996), Tomb Raider (1996) and Sonic Adventure (1998) since it is very simple to implement. However, the player is unable to move the camera to resolve occluded views or focus on areas of interest, and may jerk or end up in awkward positions if the character is near a wall.

Fixed camera systems are defined by the developers during the game creation. The camera views will not change dynamically, so the same place will always be shown under the same set of views. Games that use fixed cameras include the early Resident Evil games (1996–2002), Grim Fandango (1998), and the early Devil May Cry and God of War games. Such a system allows designers to use the language of film, creating mood through camerawork and selection of shots.

Interactive camera systems still track the character, but can also be moved by the player. One of the first games to offer an interactive camera system was Super Mario 64(1996). Fully interactive camera systems are often difficult to implement in the right way; GameSpot's Jeff Gerstmann argued that much of the Super Mario Sunshine's difficulty comes from having to control the camera. Conversely, IGN's Matt Casamassina called The Legend of Zelda: The Wind Waker's camera system "so smart that it rarely needs manual correction".

The over-the-shoulder (OTS) camera angle is commonly used in third-person shooter video games. The OTS angle is utilised in third-person shooter games as a way to bridge the gap between first-person and third-person games and to display a greater range of vision of the surrounding area. This increase in a player’s field of vision allows for clearer close combat and interaction with physical objects in the game space. The OTS angle was popularized in third-person video games by Resident Evil 4 (2005).

== Controls ==
Many games with fixed cameras use tank controls, whereby players control character movement relative to the position of the player character rather than the camera position; this allows the player to maintain direction when the camera angle changes.

On video game consoles, interactive camera systems are often controlled by an analog stick to provide good accuracy, whereas on PC games they are usually controlled by the mouse.

== See also ==
- 3D graphics
- First-person shooter engine
- Free look
- Simulator sickness
- Virtual reality
- First-person (video games)
