= Virtual reality sickness =

Nausea caused by exposure to a VR environment

Virtual reality sickness (VR sickness) occurs when exposure to a virtual environment causes symptoms that are similar to motion sickness symptoms. The most common symptoms are general discomfort, eye strain, headache, stomach awareness, nausea, vomiting, pallor, sweating, fatigue, drowsiness, disorientation, and apathy. Other symptoms include postural instability and retching. Common causes are low frame rate, input lag, and the vergence-accommodation-conflict.

Virtual reality sickness is different from motion sickness in that it can be caused by the visually-induced perception of self-motion; real self-motion is not needed. It is also different from simulator sickness; non-virtual reality simulator sickness tends to be characterized by oculomotor disturbances, whereas virtual reality sickness tends to be characterized by disorientation.

== Consequences ==
Virtual reality sickness may have undesirable consequences beyond the sickness itself. For example, Crowley (1987) argued that flight simulator sickness could discourage pilots from using flight simulators, reduce the efficiency of training through distraction and the encouragement of adaptive behaviors that are unfavorable for performance, compromise ground safety or flight safety when sick and disoriented pilots leave the simulator. Similar consequences could be expected for virtual reality systems. Although the evidence for performance decrements due to virtual reality sickness is limited, research does suggest that virtual reality sickness is a major barrier to using virtual reality, indicating that virtual reality sickness may be a barrier to the effective use of training tools and rehabilitation tools in virtual reality. Estimates of the multi-study incidence and main symptoms of virtual reality sickness (also called cybersickness) have been made.

== Causes ==
Virtual reality sickness is closely related to simulator and motion sickness. Sensory conflict theory provides a framework for understanding motion sickness; however, it can be applied to virtual reality sickness to better understand how it can occur, and is commonly used for that purpose. Sensory conflict theory posits that sickness will occur when a user's perception of self-motion is based on incongruent sensory inputs from the visual system, vestibular system, and non-vestibular proprioceptors. The Neural Mismatch theory adds that sensory conflict is not enough to cause motion sickness as people subject to the same sensory conflict could have varying degrees of motions sickness. It argues that another conflict with past experiences is necessary to trigger the condition.

A major trigger of virtual reality sickness is when there is disparity in apparent motion between the visual and vestibular stimuli. This disparity occurs if there is a disagreement between what the stimuli from the eyes and inner ear are sending to the brain. This is a fundamental cause of both simulator and motion sickness as well. In virtual reality, the eyes transmit that the person is running and jumping through a dimension, however, the ears transmit that no movement is occurring and that the body is sitting still. Since there is this discord between the eyes and the ears, a form of motion sickness can occur.

The images projected from typical virtual reality headsets have a major impact on sickness. The refresh rate of on-screen images is often not high enough when VR sickness occurs. Because the refresh rate is slower than what the brain processes, it causes a disconnect between the processing rate and the refresh rate, which causes the user to perceive glitches on the screen. When these two components do not match up, it can cause the user to experience the same feelings as simulator and motion sickness which is mentioned below.

The resolution on animation can also cause users to experience this phenomenon. When animations are poor, it causes another type of discord between what is expected and what is actually happening on the screen. When onscreen graphics do not keep the pace with the users' head movements, it can trigger a form of motion sickness.

Other critics of sensory conflict proposed the postural instability theory. This theory holds that motion sickness and related sicknesses occur because of poor postural adaptations in response to unusual coupling between visual stimuli and motor coordination. Characteristic markers of postural instability occur prior to appearance of symptoms and predict the later development of symptoms. This theory can explain some otherwise surprising situations in which motion sickness did not occur in the presence of sensory conflict. However, it is also arguable than postural imbalance is predictable in new and unfamiliar environments. And that the contradiction with experience could be the primary cause of motion sickness as explained by the Neural Mismatch Theory.

== Technical aspects ==
There are various technical aspects of virtual reality that can induce sickness, such as mismatched motion, field of view, motion parallax, and viewing angle. Additionally, the amount of time spent in virtual reality can increase the presence of symptoms. Mismatched motion can be defined as a discrepancy between the motion of the simulation and the motion that the user expects. It is possible to induce motion sickness in virtual reality when the frequencies of mismatched motion are similar to those for motion sickness in reality, such as seasickness. These frequencies can be experimentally manipulated, but also have the propensity to arise from system errors. Generally, increasing the field of view increases incidence of simulator sickness symptoms. This relationship has been shown to be curvilinear, with symptoms approaching an asymptote for fields of view above 140°. Altering motion parallax distances to those less than the distance between the human eyes in large multiple-screen simulation setups can induce oculomotor distress, such as headaches, eyestrain, and blurred vision. There are fewer reports of oculomotor distress on smaller screens; however, most simulation setups with motion parallax effects can still induce eyestrain, fatigue, and general discomfort over time. Viewing angle has been shown to increase a user's sickness symptoms, especially at extreme angles. One example of such an extreme angle would be when a user must look downwards a short distance in front of their virtual feet. As opposed to a forward viewing angle, an extreme downward angle such as this has been shown to markedly increase sickness in virtual environments. Time spent immersed in a virtual environment contributes to sickness symptom presence due to the increasing effects of fatigue on the user. Oculomotor symptoms are the most common to occur due to immersion time, but the nature of the user's movements (e.g., whole-body vs. head-only) is suggested to be the primary cause of nausea or physical sickness.

== Techniques for reducing VR sickness ==
According to several studies, introducing a static frame of reference (independent visual background) may reduce simulation sickness. A technique called Nasum Virtualis shows a virtual nose as a fixed frame of reference for VR headsets.

Other techniques for reducing nausea involve simulating ways of displacement that don't create or reduce discrepancies between the visual aspects and body movement, such as room-scale VR, reducing rotational motions during navigation, dynamically reducing the field of view, teleportation, and movement in zero gravity.

In January 2020, the French start-up Boarding Ring, known for their glasses against motion sickness, released an add-on device against virtual reality sickness. Using two small screens in the user's peripheral field of view, the device displays visual information consistent with vestibular inputs, avoiding the sensory conflict.

Galvanic vestibular stimulation, which creates the illusion of motion by electric stimulation of the vestibular system, is another technique being explored for its potential to mitigate or eliminate the visual-vestibular mismatch.

To alleviate these symptoms, methods such as gradual adaptation to VR and the use of natural remedies like ginger. Choosing VR games designed to minimize motion sickness can also reduce nausea and improve the user experience.

== Newest technology ==
With the integration of virtual reality into the more commercial mainstream, issues have begun to arise in relation to VR sickness in head-mounted gaming devices. While research on head-mounted VR for gaming dates back to the early 1990s, the potential for mass usability has only become recently realized. Contemporary VR headsets appear to induce minimal to none VR sickness.

While certain features are known to moderate VR sickness in head-mounted displays, such as playing from a seated position rather than standing, it has also been found that this merely puts off the onset of sickness, rather than completely preventing it. This inherently presents an issue, in that this type of interactive VR often involves standing or walking for a fully immersive experience. Gaming VR specialists argue that this unique brand of VR sickness is only a minor issue, claiming that it disappears with time spent (multiple days) using the head-mounted displays, relating it to "getting your sea legs". However, getting users interested in sickness for multiple days with the promise of "probably getting over it" is a struggle for developers of head-mounted gaming tech. Surveys have shown that a large percentage of people won't develop their "VR legs," in particular women. These same developers also argue that it has more to do with the individual game being played, and that certain gaming aspects are more likely to create issues, such as change in speed, walking up stairs, and jumping, which are all, unfortunately, fairly normal game functions in predominant genres.

== Individual differences in susceptibility ==
Individuals vary widely in their susceptibility to simulator and virtual reality sickness. Some of the factors in virtual reality sickness are listed below:

- Age: Susceptibility to motion sickness is highest between the ages of 2 and 12. It then decreases rapidly until about age 21, and continues to decrease more slowly after that. It has been suggested that virtual reality sickness might follow a similar pattern, but more recent research has suggested that adults over the age of 50 are more susceptible than younger adults to virtual reality sickness.
- Postural stability: Postural instability has been found to increase susceptibility to visually-induced motion sickness. It is also associated with increased susceptibility to nausea and disorientation symptoms of virtual reality sickness.
- Flicker fusion frequency threshold: Because flicker in the display has been associated with increased risk of virtual reality sickness, people with a low threshold for detecting flicker may be more susceptible to virtual reality sickness.
- Ethnicity: Asian people may be more susceptible to virtual reality sickness. Chinese women appear to be more susceptible to virtual reality sickness than European-American and African-American women; research suggests that they are more susceptible to vision-based motion sickness. Tibetans and Northeast Indians also appear to be more susceptible to motion sickness than Caucasian people, suggesting that they would also be more susceptible to virtual reality sickness, since susceptibility to motion sickness predicts susceptibility to a wide range of motion-sickness related disturbances.
- Experience with the system: Users seem to become less likely to develop virtual reality sickness as they develop familiarity with a virtual reality system. Adaptation may occur as quickly as the second exposure to the virtual reality system.
- Gender: Women are more susceptible than men to virtual reality sickness. This may be due to hormonal differences, it may be because women have a wider field of view than men, or gender differences in depth cue recognition. Women are most susceptible to virtual reality sickness during ovulation and a wider field of view is also associated with an increase in virtual reality sickness. In more recent research, there is some disagreement as to whether gender or sex is a clear factor in susceptibility to virtual reality sickness.
- Health: Susceptibility to virtual reality sickness appears to increase in people who are not at their usual level of health, suggesting that virtual reality may not be appropriate for people who are in ill health. This includes people who are fatigued; have not had enough sleep; are nauseated; or have an upper respiratory illness, ear trouble, or influenza.
- Mental rotation ability: Better mental rotation ability appears to reduce susceptibility to virtual reality sickness, suggesting that training users in mental rotation may reduce the incidence of virtual reality sickness.
- Field dependence/independence: Field dependence/independence is a measure of perceptual style. Those with strong field dependence exhibit a strong influence of surrounding environment on their perception of an object, whereas people with strong field independence show a smaller influence of surrounding environment on their perception of the object. While the relationship between field dependence/independence and virtual reality sickness is complex, it appears that, in general, people without a strong tendency towards one extreme or the other are most susceptible to virtual reality sickness.
- Motion sickness sensitivity: Those who are more sensitive to motion sickness in reality are also more sensitive to virtual reality sickness.

== Measurement ==
The subjective sickness questionnaire (SSQ) is the most widely used for measuring the subjective level of cybersickness. It consists of sixteen items associated with cybersickness and employs a straightforward scoring approach to evaluate the severity of discomfort.

== See also ==
- Immersion (virtual reality)
- Screen-door effect
- Vergence-accommodation conflict
- Vestibulo-ocular reflex
