= Room-scale =

Room-scale VR: Free movement in virtual reality using 360-degree tracking

Room-scale is a design paradigm for virtual reality (VR) experiences which allows users to freely walk around a play area, with their real-life motion reflected in the VR environment. Using 360 degree tracking equipment such as infrared sensors, the VR system monitors the user's movement in all directions, and translates this into the virtual world in real-time. This allows the player to perform tasks, such as walking across a room and picking up a key from a table, using natural movements. In contrast, a stationary VR experience might have the player navigate across the room using a joystick or other input device, which may cause motion sickness.

The HTC Vive virtual-reality system incorporates room-scale tracking in its core design, using two infrared tracking stations located in opposite corners of the room to monitor the movement of the player. Its SteamVR tracking technology is developed by Valve and allows areas up to 10 m x 10 m.

The Oculus Rift VR system was introduced primarily for front facing 180 degree experiences. However, Oculus now supports two sensor diagonal placement roomscale or users can purchase a third sensor to enable more robust room-scale tracking,

== Criticism ==
Room-scale experiences require a large amount of empty space for the player to walk around without the risk of bumping into real-life obstacles. In a typical home, this can require an entire room to be dedicated solely to room-scale VR, which may not be practical in a small home or apartment. Since the amount of space available in a room-scale setup will vary from location to location, developers cannot assume a fixed play space, and users' experiences may vary depending on the amount of space they have available.
