= Vergence–accommodation conflict =

Visual and perceptual phenomenon

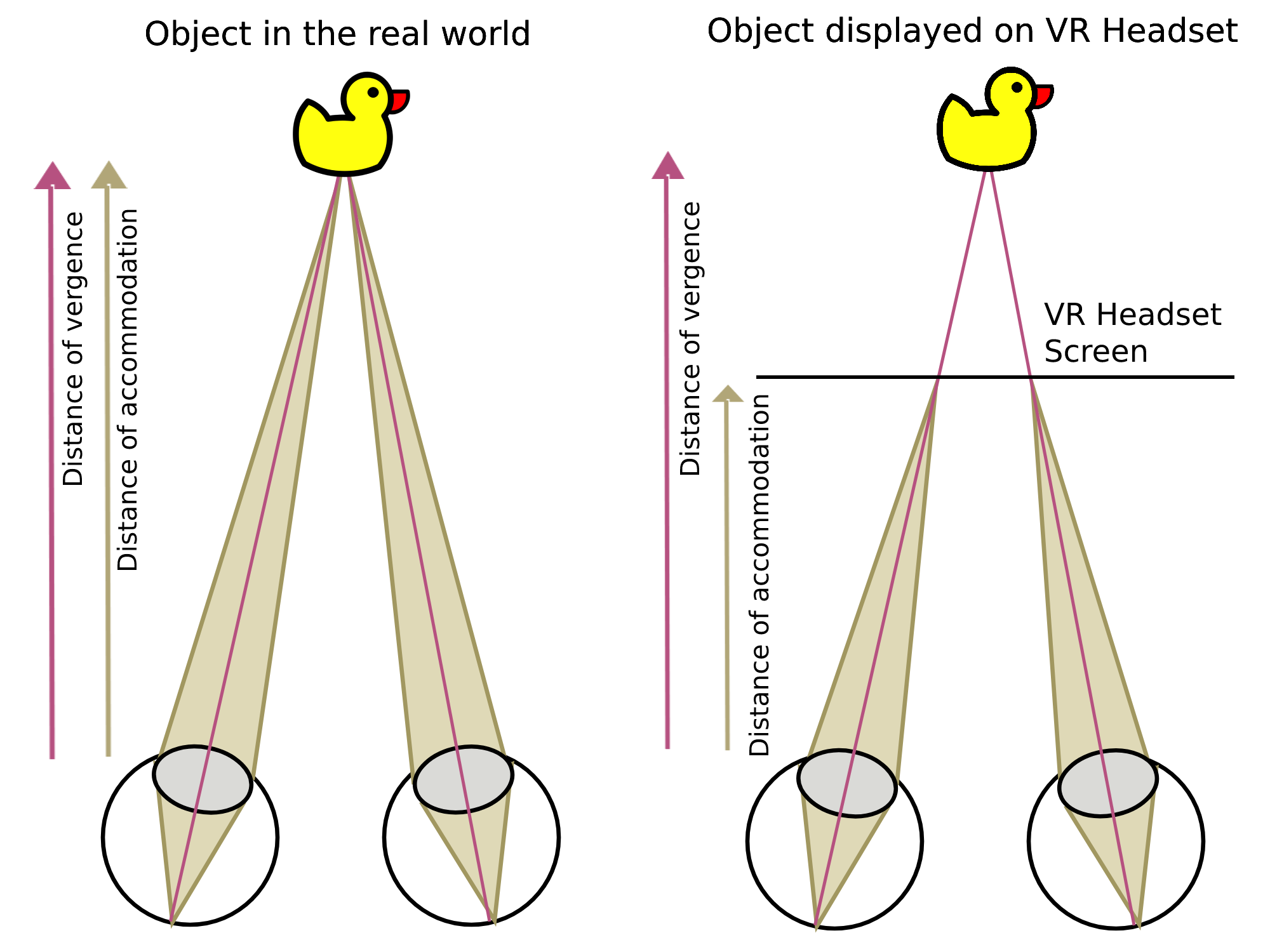
The vergence–accommodation conflict as it can occur in virtual reality

Vergence–accommodation conflict (VAC), also known as accommodation–vergence conflict, is a visual phenomenon that occurs when the brain receives mismatching cues between vergence and accommodation of the eye. This commonly occurs in virtual reality devices, augmented reality devices, 3D movies, and other types of stereoscopic displays and autostereoscopic displays. The effect can be unpleasant and cause eye strain.

VAC happens due to two main visual system responses being mismatched when viewing a 3D display: vergence of eyes and accommodation of the eyes. Both of these mechanisms are crucial in stereoscopic vision. Vergence or independent inward/outward rotation of eyes is engaged to fixate on objects and perceive them as single. Incorrect vergence response can cause double vision. Accommodation is the eye's focusing mechanism and it is engaged to produce a sharp image on a retina. Both of these mechanisms are neurally linked forming the accommodation-convergence reflex of eyes. One can distinguish vergence distance—a distance of a point towards which both eyes are converging, and an accommodation distance—a distance of a region in space towards which the focus or refractive power of the crystalline lens has been adjusted to produce a sharp image on the retina.

In normal conditions the human visual system expects vergence and accommodation distances to match. When viewing most artificial 3D images or displays, vergence and accommodation distances for the most part are mismatched. The human visual system has not evolved to view these types of artificial 3D images comfortably, so VAC can be a very unpleasant sensation for the viewer.

VAC is often encountered when viewing stereograms, 3D movies, or virtual reality (VR). It can cause visual fatigue and headaches after a short period of time; It is one of the main contributors to virtual reality sickness. The phenomenon can make it impossible to focus on objects close to the eye in VR, limiting the development of VR software.

VAC is very difficult to overcome when designing new types of 3D displays.

== Effects ==
People playing 3D video games have often reported eye strain afterward, or that the 3D effect is disorienting. This is because of VAC. There is not a strong consensus on the extent of visual damage, if any, that may occur due to overexposure to VAC. Even though this is the case, users of classic stereoscopic devices report being unable to look at the 3D screen for a long period of time.

== Measure of VAC ==
Vergence–accommodation conflict can be quantified; typically, by comparing the optical power required to focus on objects at the vergence distance with the optical power required to focus on objects at the accommodation distance. In this context, optical power is equal to the reciprocal of distance, with units of diopter (m^{−1}). Hence the difference between the reciprocal of the vergence distance and the reciprocal of the accommodation distance characterizes the extent of VAC.

In the example of a virtual reality head-mounted display, the accommodation distance corresponds to the distance of the virtual image plane. Often the optics are designed to place a virtual screen somewhere between two meters and infinity. That is, for a virtual display at a two-meter distance, the target accommodation distance expressed in diopters would be 0.5 D. In contrast, the vergence distance in a stereoscopic display can change freely based on the location of target content. For example, a virtual object by means of binocular disparity can be placed at a 30 cm distance, corresponding to 3.33 diopters. In such a case, the magnitude of the VAC for a person with normal vision would be 3.33 − 0.5 = 2.83 diopters.

== Physiology ==
The vergence–accommodation conflict is caused due to factors in human physiology like the accommodation reflex. VAC occurs when the human brain receives mismatching cues between vergence and accommodation. It often causes headaches and visual fatigue. The vergence–accommodation conflict is one of the main causes of virtual reality sickness.

Most people can tolerate some extent of VAC, without noticeable onset of adverse effects. While it depends on a particular person and viewing distance, VAC of around up to 0.4 diopters is within comfort limits of most people.

The vergence–accommodation conflict can have permanent effects on eyesight. Children under the age of six are recommended to avoid 3D displays that cause VAC. Meta Half Dome prototypes addressed the problem with variable focus lenses that matched focal depth to vergence stereoscopic depth. The first prototype used bulky mechanical actuators to refocus the lens. The third prototype used a stack of 6 liquid crystal lens layers where each layer could be turned on and off by applying a voltage, and this creates 64 discrete focal planes. There are currently no production products using this technology.

== Causes ==
=== Virtual and augmented reality ===
All first-generation VR and augmented reality (AR) headsets are fixed-focus devices that can cause VAC. Popular examples of these devices include the Oculus Quest 2, HTC Vive, Valve Index and the Microsoft HoloLens. VAC can be experienced by bringing a virtual object very close to one's eyes in the headset and trying to focus on it.

Not all 3D displays cause the vergence–accommodation conflict. New types of displays are being developed that do not cause VAC, such as holographic displays and light field displays.

=== Other causes ===
VAC can also be experienced when using other technologies, including:

- when viewing a stereogram through a stereoscope
- when viewing an autostereogram using an eye defocusing technique
- when viewing 3D cinema and 3D TV (not as pronounced as other kinds of media like VR)
- autostereoscopic displays, such as the one found in the Nintendo 3DS

== Mitigations ==
VR and AR hardware companies often ask software developers not to show virtual content too close to the user in the devices. However, this is only a software mitigation and often times the effect can still be noticed.

In the same way that VR users can become acclimated to motion in VR (through practice and exposure to overcome motion sickness), they can likewise train their pupils to maintain distance focus while slowly bringing a virtual object closer to their face.

== Solutions ==
The only true solution to the vergence–accommodation conflict is to avoid looking at anything that causes the phenomenon. However, in VR and AR, new types of displays have been developed since the 2010s that can minimize or eliminate VAC to non-issue levels. These displays include varifocal, multifocal, holographic, pin-mirror and light field displays.

Varifocal displays are a concept explored mainly in VR display solutions. The basic principle relies on dynamically adjusting focal distance of displays based on the gaze direction. The technique requires an eye-tracking solution and means of modulating focal distance of a screen. Modulation of a focal distance can be, for example, physical actuation of the screen in relation to a fixed eyepiece optics, alternatively it can be utilization of varifocal lens element(s). While varifocal approach mitigates or entirely solves VAC, it cannot convey realistic monocular focus cues. To try to add realism, these techniques rely on image processing techniques to simulate focus cues.

Multifocal displays are another way of overcoming VAC. The principle of operation relies on availability of multiple image focal planes (screens), which from the perspective of a viewer are available simultaneously at all times. This gives the ability to accommodate eyes within the available range of focal distances and perceive realistic monocular focus (image blur) cues similarly to natural viewing conditions. Essentially multifocal displays discretize the depth dimension and split or slice the 3D content according to the available configuration of depth planes to minimize VAC. The topic of multifocal displays has been generously researched for at least several decades, nevertheless, there is only a limited offering of commercially available multifocal near-eye displays.

Light field displays are another way to solve the vergence–accommodation conflict. They share features with integral imaging displays. CREAL, a near-eye display manufacturer for AR headsets and glasses, developed a light field display technology that projects the light rays just like they exist in the real world. This way, the virtual content has a real depth, and each eye can change focus naturally between the virtual objects, from up close to infinity.

SeeReal Technologies, a manufacturer of displays for 3D-enabled mobile devices, claim that their displays can generate visuals that do not have fixed accommodation. The company developed the display used in the Takee 1 smartphone. However, SeeReal's solution requires eye tracking, which can limit the 3D capabilities of the displays such as the field of view of the 3D effect.

== See also ==
- Accommodative convergence
- Binocular vision
- Depth perception
- Health effects of 3D
- Holographic display
- Multiscopy
- Polarized 3D system
- Screen-door effect, in virtual reality headsets
- Stereopsis
- Uncanny valley
- Virtual reality sickness
