= Arte Museum =

South Korean immersive art franchise

Arte Museum is a South Korean immersive art franchise created by the Seoul-based digital design firm d'strict. The first location opened in the Aewol district of Jeju City, South Korea, in 2020. The franchise has since expanded to multiple cities in South Korea and abroad.

== Design ==
Arte Museums feature immersive, self-guided exhibits spread across thousands of square feet. They use projection mapping, multi-image control, and sensor-based interaction technology. Sound design includes work by music director Young-gyu Jang, a film composer known for scores including Train to Busan and The Wailing. Jin Lee has been identified as d'strict's creative director, and Sean Lee as CEO of d'strict. Some locations include an Arte Cafe.

== Locations ==
Arte Museum locations include sites in South Korea and overseas.

=== South Korea ===
- Jeju Island. Opened in late September 2020.
- Yeosu.
- Gangneung.
- Busan.

=== Outside South Korea ===
- Chengdu, China.
- Hong Kong.
- Dubai, United Arab Emirates. Opened in February 2024.
- Las Vegas, Nevada, United States. Opened in February 2024.
- New York City, New York, United States. Opened in September 2025.
- Orlando, Florida, United States. Scheduled for 2027.

The Dubai location is in the Dubai Mall and showcases 14 media art pieces. Several are from Korea and others reflect Dubai's geography. Exhibits include "Lights of Dubai" and "Live Canvas Desert".

The Las Vegas location includes a "Garden" exhibit of three installations: "Light of Las Vegas", "Light of Masterpieces", and "Night Safari", in addition to a "Raindrops" room. It covers 30,000 square feet.

The New York location opened on Chelsea Piers. It showcases 16 large-scale media artworks, including works previously shown in Korea, such as "Flower" and "Beach". Others are inspired by New York's geography and cityscape.

As of September 2025, Arte Museum had received over 10 million visitors to its seven branches globally.
