= Holographic display =

Type of 3D display

A holographic display is a type of 3D display that utilizes light diffraction to reconstruct a 3D wavefront of an object or a scene and therefore display a three-dimensional image to the viewer. Holographic displays are distinguished from other forms of 3D displays in that they do not require the viewer to wear any special glasses or use external equipment to be able to see the image, and do not cause a vergence-accommodation conflict.

Some commercially available 3D displays are advertised as being holographic, but are actually multiscopic.

== Timeline ==
1947 – Hungarian scientist Dennis Gabor first came up with the concept of a hologram while trying to improve the resolution of electron microscopes. He derived the name for holography, with "holos" being the Greek word for "whole," and "gramma" which is the term for "message."

1960 – The world's first laser was developed by Soviet scientists Nikolay Basov and Alexander Prokhorov, and American scientist Charles H. Townes. This was a major milestone for holography because laser technology serves as the basis of some modern day holographic displays.

1962 – Yuri Denisyuk invented the white-light reflection hologram which was the first hologram that could be viewed under the light given off by an ordinary incandescent light bulb. Emmett Leith and Juris Upatnieks developed off-axis holography, a technique that introduced a reference beam at an angle to the object beam, effectively separating the real and virtual images and allowing high-quality, distortion-free holograms to be recorded and reconstructed.

1968 – White-light transmission holography was invented by Stephen Benton. This type of holography was unique because it was able to reproduce the entire spectrum of colors by separating the seven colors that create white light.

1972 - Lloyd Cross produced the first traditional hologram by using white-light transmission holography to recreate a moving 3-dimensional image.

1989 – MIT spatial imaging group pioneered electroholography, which uses magnetic waves and acoustic-optical sensors to portray moving pictures onto a display.

2011 – DARPA announces the Urban Photonic Sand Table (UPST) project, a dynamic digital holographic tabletop display.

2012 – The first holographic display is implemented in a car's interactive navigation display system. The technology was showcased through the exclusive luxury car, the Lykan HyperSport.

2013 – MIT researcher Michael Bove predicts that holographic displays will enter the mass market within the next ten years, adding that we already have all the technology necessary for holographic displays.

== Types of holographic displays ==
=== Micromagnetic piston display ===
The piston display, invented by Belgian company IMEC in 2011, utilizes a MEMS (micro-electro-mechanical system) based structure. In this type of display, thousands of microscopic pistons are able to be manipulated up and down to act as pixels, which in turn reflect light with a desired wavelength to represent an image. This developing technology is currently in the prototype phase, as IMEC is still developing the mechanism that will mobilize their "pixels" more effectively. Some of the limitations of this type of this display include the high cost, difficulty of creating large screens, and its susceptibility to mechanical failures due to the relatively large amount of moving parts (microscopic pistons).

=== Holographic television display ===
The holographic television display was created by MIT researcher Michael Bove in 2013. Dr. Bove used a Microsoft Kinect camera as a relatively effective way to capture subjects in a three-dimensional space. The image is then processed by a PC graphics card and replicated with a series of laser diodes. The produced image is fully 3-dimensional and can be viewed from all 360 degrees to gain spatial perspective. Bove claimed that this technology would be widespread by 2023, and that the technology will cost as much as today's ordinary consumer TVs.

== Technologies used ==
=== Laser ===
Most modern day holograms use a laser as its light source. In this type of hologram, a laser is shone onto a scene that is then reflected onto a recording apparatus. In addition, part of the laser must shine directly onto a specific area of the display to act as a reference beam. The purpose of the reference beam is to provide the recording device with information such as background light, picture angle, and beam profile. The image is then processed to compensate for any variation in picture fidelity, and then sent to the display.

=== Full parallax/HPO/VPO ===
Full parallax holography is the process of delivering optical information in both the x and y directions. The resulting image will therefore provide the same perspective of a scene to all viewers regardless of viewing angle.

Horizontal Parallax Only (HPO) and Vertical Parallax Only (VPO) displays only deliver optical information in two dimensions. This method of display partially compromises the image in certain viewing angles, but it requires much less computational power and data transfer. Because humans' eyes are positioned side by side, HPO displays are generally preferred over VPO displays, and sometimes preferred over full parallax displays due to their lesser demand on processing power.

=== MEMS ===
MEMS technology allows holographic displays to incorporate very small moving parts into its design. The prime example of a MEMS-enabled display is the piston display, listed in the above section. Micropistons used in the display can behave like pixels on a computer monitor, allowing for sharp image quality.

== See also ==
- Holographic screen
