= Simulator sickness =

Subset of motion sickness

Simulator sickness is a subset of motion sickness that is typically experienced while playing video games from first-person perspective. It was discovered in the context of aircraft pilots who undergo training for extended periods of time in flight simulators. Due to the spatial limitations imposed on these simulators, perceived discrepancies between the motion of the simulator and that of the vehicle can occur and lead to simulator sickness. It is similar to motion sickness in many ways, but occurs in simulated environments and can be induced without actual motion. Symptoms of simulator sickness include discomfort, apathy, drowsiness, disorientation, fatigue, and nausea. These symptoms can reduce the effectiveness of simulators in flight training and result in systematic consequences such as decreased simulator use, compromised training, ground safety, and flight safety. Pilots are less likely to want to repeat the experience in a simulator if they have suffered from simulator sickness and hence can reduce the number of potential users. It can also compromise training in two safety-critical ways:

1. It can distract the pilot during training sessions.
2. It can cause the pilot to adopt certain counterproductive behaviors to prevent symptoms from occurring.

Simulator sickness can also have post-training effects that can compromise safety after the simulator session, such as when the pilots drive away from the facility or fly while experiencing symptoms of simulator sickness.

== Origins ==
Though human-piloted aviation has existed since the early 20th century, simulator sickness did not arise as an issue for pilots until much later when the first fixed-base simulators were created. Bell Aircraft created a helicopter simulator for the Navy during the 1950s, and it was found "that a large number of observers (mostly helicopter pilots) experienced some degree of vertigo during these demonstrations". Navy psychologists performed further study on the pilots who participated in these simulator exercises, and found that 28 out of 36 respondents to their evaluations experienced sickness. Additionally, psychologists found that experienced flight instructors seemed to be most susceptible. In fact, 60% of the instructors reported simulator sickness symptoms compared to only 12% of the students. "The SS usually occurred in the first ten minutes of a training session and frequently lasted for several hours afterward."

Two main theories exist about the causes of simulator sickness. The first is sensory conflict theory. Optical flow patterns generated in virtual environments typically induce perception of self-motion (i.e., vection). Sensory conflict theory holds that, when this perception of self-motion is not corroborated by inertial forces transmitted through the vestibular system, simulator sickness is likely to occur. Thus, sensory conflict theory predicts that keeping the visual and vestibular inputs in agreement can reduce the likelihood of simulator sickness experienced by users. Additionally, according to this theory, people who do not have a functioning vestibular component of their nervous system should not show either simulator sickness or motion sickness.

The second theory for simulator sickness identifies postural instability as the determinant of simulator sickness. This theory notes that situations producing simulator sickness are denoted by their unfamiliarity to the participant more than the degree of sensory conflict; for example, sea sickness is, for many, a transient problem that is solved with experience to being on a ship. Thus, the novelty of the motion cues is hypothesized to lead to an inability to maintain postural control and this lack of control causes simulator sickness until the participant adapts. Key attributes here include the notation that the motions causing simulator sickness are in a nauseogenic low frequency range that overlaps with the frequency of motion within the human body as it maintains control over its posture. Experiments have measured markers of the onset of postural instability, and found that it precedes signs and symptoms of simulator sickness.

At present, it is accurate to say that both—and neither—of these theories are yet adequate to fully explain and predict simulator sickness. Although it is clear which types of pilots are affected by it, and both sensory conflict theory and postural instability theory relate its onset with certain physiological conflicts, neither theory suffices to predict why these specific conflicts (vision vs. vestibular on the one hand, posture vs. control on the other) elicit sickness in the subject. Additional possibilities for elicitation of motion sickness in general (including simulator sickness) include gaze destabilization, which is disrupted if the vestibuloocular reflex gain in the nervous system is altered, moving patterns of visual stimuli, and motions that stimulate the otoliths and semicircular canals of the inner ear. It is unclear whether or not these stimuli are encountered in significant amounts in a simulator to induce sickness in the expert pilots. However, since laboratory studies have shown the removal of the vestibular projection areas of the cerebellum (in laboratory animals) to result in insusceptibility to motion sickness, it is almost certainly probable that the first of these theories holds the most promise with regard to research into the direct physiological causes of the phenomenon.

== Effect of experience in the real and simulated environments ==
While anyone can experience simulator sickness, studies in flight simulators have found a correlation between the appearance of symptoms and the flight experience of the pilot. Studies conducted independently by the US Navy, US Coast Guard, and US Army during the 1980s all came to the same conclusion: the greater experience of the pilot, the higher the likelihood of sickness symptoms during simulation training exercises.

In 1989, the US Army released a report detailing the results of a study examining simulator sickness in UH-60 Blackhawk flight simulators, confirming the above hypothesis. The report also found that longer periods between sessions of flight simulation training resulted in greater probability of detrimental symptoms appearing increased.

Research suggests that this is the body's natural way of adjusting to these systems. The bodies of experienced pilots have adapted to different types of motion experienced during actual flight conditions. When placed into a flight simulator, visual and other stimuli cause their bodies to expect the same motions associated with actual flight conditions. However, their bodies instead experience the imperfect motion of the simulator, resulting in sickness.

A similar situation can arise for pilots who have long gaps between simulator uses. During simulation training, the body will eventually adapt to the environment to diminish the effects of simulator sickness. However, when long periods of time are spent outside of the simulator, the body is not able to adequately adapt and symptoms will reappear.

Often, adaptation is the single most effective solution to simulator sickness. For most individuals, adaptation can occur within only a few sessions, with only a minority of individuals (3–5 percent) never being able to adapt. This adaptation occurs within the psyche of the individual with repeated, controlled exposures, without any required alteration to the simulator. Through incremental exposures, dispersed regularly over a series of days, adaptation can occur faster than that of an abrupt all-encompassing exposure. However, following adaptation to the novel simulator motion environment, simulator sickness symptoms can reoccur with a return to the former environment. For this reason, simulator sickness is commonly referred to as a phenomenon of maladaptation sickness, due to incessant conflict between current and past environmental conditions. In flight training, this phenomenon can be a safety concern where it may lead to motion sickness hindering pilot performance in the real aircraft following flight simulator training.

== Measurement ==
The Simulator Sickness Questionnaire (SSQ) is currently the standard for measuring simulator sickness. The SSQ was developed based upon 1,119 pairs of pre-exposure/post-exposure scores from data that were collected and reported earlier. These data were collected from 10 Navy flight simulators representing both fixed-wing and rotary-wing aircraft. The simulators selected were both 6-DOF motion and fixed-base models, and also represented a variety of visual display technologies. The SSQ was developed and validated with data from pilots who reported to simulator training healthy and fit.

The SSQ is a self-report symptom checklist. It includes 16 symptoms that are associated with simulator sickness. Participants indicate the level of severity of these symptoms that they are experiencing currently. For each symptom there are four levels of severity (none, slight, moderate, severe). The SSQ provides a Total Severity score as well as scores for three subscales (Nausea, Oculomotor, and Disorientation). The Total Severity score is a composite created from the three subscales. It is the best single measure because it provides an index of the overall symptoms. The three subscales provide diagnostic information about particular symptom categories:

- Nausea subscale is made up of symptoms such as increased salivation, sweating, nausea, stomach awareness, and burping.
- Oculomotor subscale includes symptoms such as fatigue, headache, eyestrain, and difficulty focusing.
- Disorientation subscale is composed of symptoms such as vertigo, dizzy (eyes open), dizzy (eyes closed), and blurred vision.

The three subscales are not orthogonal to one another. There is a general factor common to all of them. Nonetheless, the subscales provide differential information about participants' experience of symptoms and are useful for determining the particular pattern of discomfort produced by a given simulator. All scores have as their lowest level a natural zero (no symptoms) and increase with increasing symptoms reported.

In some cases, the Motion Sickness Assessment Questionnaire (MSAQ) has also been used to evaluate simulator sickness, despite its focus on motion sickness.

== Gaming motion sickness ==
Many video gamers, notably the late John Peter "TotalBiscuit" Bain, report motion sickness while playing games with a narrow field of view (FOV). Depending on screen size and distance, FOV settings of generally 90 to 110 degrees may be good for close up (PC gaming) and 60 to 75 degrees for further away (console gaming). A small but significant amount of gamers are affected if FOV is not set properly. Other factors and settings such as motion blur and head bobbing may also affect player discomfort.
