= ZCam =

Brand of 3D time-of-flight camera products in the 2000s by 3DV Systems

ZCam is a brand of time-of-flight camera products for video applications by Israeli developer 3DV Systems. The ZCam supplements full-color video camera imaging with real-time range imaging information, allowing for the capture of video in 3D.

The original ZCam, (Note: The name has been formatted several different ways, including "ZCAM" and "Zcam". Although the "ZCam" styling had been used for the studio camera add-on, the 3DV website currently refers to the original product as "Z-Cam", and the webcam product as "ZCam".) released in 2000, was an ENG video camera add-on used for digital video compositing. Before agreeing in March 2009 to sell its assets to Microsoft, 3DV had planned to release a ranging video webcam (previously called the Z-Sense), also under the name ZCam. The ZCam webcam was one of several competing real-time range imaging camera products in development that target home game controller applications. (Note: Other companies developing competing cameras included Canesta and PrimeSense.)

== Technology ==
The ZCam's time-of-flight camera system features a near-infrared (NIR) pulse illumination component, as well as an image sensor with a fast gating mechanism. Based on the known speed of light, ZCam coordinates the timing of NIR pulse wave emissions from the illuminator with the gating of the image sensor, so that the signal reflected from within a desired depth range is captured exclusively. The amount of pulse signal collected for each pixel corresponds to where within the depth range the pulse was reflected from, and can thus be used to calculate the distance to a corresponding point on the captured subject.

Due to the fast timing required for light-based time-of-flight, the ZCam uses custom hardware for illumination and gating. The illuminator is a series of NIR laser diodes around the lens barrel, switched by special high-speed driver circuits that produce pulses with a rise time and fall time of less than one nanosecond. Previously using an image intensifier for gating the image sensor, 3DV later developed a special solid-state image shutter, in the form of a gallium arsenide-based electro-optical chip that is mounted atop the image sensor. The company was reportedly developing a gating solution based on less-expensive CMOS-process fabrication.

The time-of-flight camera is optically matched with a corresponding video camera, allowing the RGB video and range imaging to integrated together. 3DV refers to the combination as "RGBD" (or RGB-D), in which "D" refers to a "depth" or "distance" channel.

== Webcam ==
Targeted primarily at the video game market, the ZCam webcam was designed to be used as a game controller like the EyeToy, using gesture recognition to interpret hand and body gestures for controlling the interface, but without many of the complications of a purely 2D-based computer vision approach. Developing the device since 2005, 3DV completed the initial prototype in late 2006, and officially announced the product in late 2007.

The ZCam webcam had a 60-degree field of view, a frame rate of 60 Hz, a 1.3 megapixel full color video resolution, and an 8-bit Quarter VGA ranging resolution (320x240 pixels with 256 depth levels per pixel). Precision was fine as 1-2 centimeters, with a practical ranging limit of 0.5–2.5 meters distance. The webcam connected via a USB 2.0 interface. Demonstrations included a boxing game, an airplane demo, Windows Media Center hand-gesture control, and a body-gesture Second Life interface.

3DV stated that the webcam would be priced comparably to other peripherals in the gaming market such as the PlayStation Eye: less than US$100, with a bundled US$69.99 price mentioned as a possibility. The webcam was to include software development kits for camera control and gesture recognition. 3DV originally projected the ZCam to be released before the end of 2008, then later revised the projection to 2009. In March 2009, the company agreed to sell its assets including the ZCam to a third party, later confirmed to be Microsoft. Following these reports, it was speculated that Microsoft would use the ZCam technology for a motion-sensing controller system for the Xbox 360 video game console or its successor. This speculation increased in the month leading up to Microsoft's announcement of the Kinect 3D depth-sensing device at the 2009 Electronic Entertainment Expo, during which leaked information about that device prompted frequent comparisons with the ZCam.

== See also ==
- Time-of-flight camera
- Canesta
- Kinect
- Omek Interactive
- PrimeSense
- Softkinetic
