= Omek Interactive =

Former technology company

- Type: Private
- Industry: Computer software
- Founded: 2006; 20 years ago
- Founder: Janine Kutliroff, Gershom Kutliroff, Shai Yagur
- Headquarters: Israel
- Products: Beckon Development Suite; Grasp Development Suite
- Website: www.omekinteractive.com

Omek Interactive was a venture-backed technology company developing advanced motion-sensing software for human-computer interaction in automobiles, casinos and arcades, consumer electronics, video games, health care and digital signage. Omek was co-founded in 2006 by Janine Kutliroff and Gershom Kutliroff.

== Company overview ==
Omek Interactive was an Israeli company that developed gesture recognition and motion tracking software for use in combination with 3D depth sensor cameras. Omek’s middleware was sensor-independent, supporting multiple cameras including those based on a Structured light and Time-of-flight camera technology. Omek's software worked with the following cameras: PrimeSense-based Microsoft Kinect, PMD Technologies CamCube, SoftKinetic DepthSense, and Panasonic D-Imager.

In July 2011 Intel Capital led its Round C financing with $7 million. Among the investors was Eliyahu Haddad who invested $2 million. Mr. Haddad was also given a seat on the Board.

Intel confirmed on July 16, 2013, that it had acquired Omek, but did not confirm the reported price of $30–50 million.

== Technology ==
Omek’s flagship product was the Beckon Development Suite, which converted raw depth data from 3D cameras and turned it into intelligence about humans in the scene, through background subtraction, joints tracking, skeleton identification, and gesture recognition. The Beckon software solution included the Gesture Authoring Tool, a machine learning tool that enabled developers to create gestures without writing any code.

In March 2012, at the Embedded Vision Alliance Summit, Omek announced the upcoming availability of their Grasp Development Suite. Grasp focuses on close-range, hand and finger tracking and gesture recognition at distances of 1 meter and less. At the same event Omek also announced support for Texas Instruments’ BeagleBoard-xM evaluation board, a low-cost, low-power, embedded computing platform.

== See also ==
- Natural user interface
- Human-computer interaction
- Gesture recognition
- Computer vision
