= LDRI =

LDRI may refer to:

- Laser Dynamic Range Imager, a LIDAR range imaging device developed by Sandia National Laboratories for the US Space Shuttle program
- LDRI, the ICAO code for Rijeka Airport, Croatia
