= IISU =

IISU may refer to:

- ISRO Inertial Systems Unit (IISU), a unit of the Indian Space Research Organisation
- iisu, the gesture recognition software platform by Softkinetic
