= Projection keyboard =

Virtual device projected onto a surface

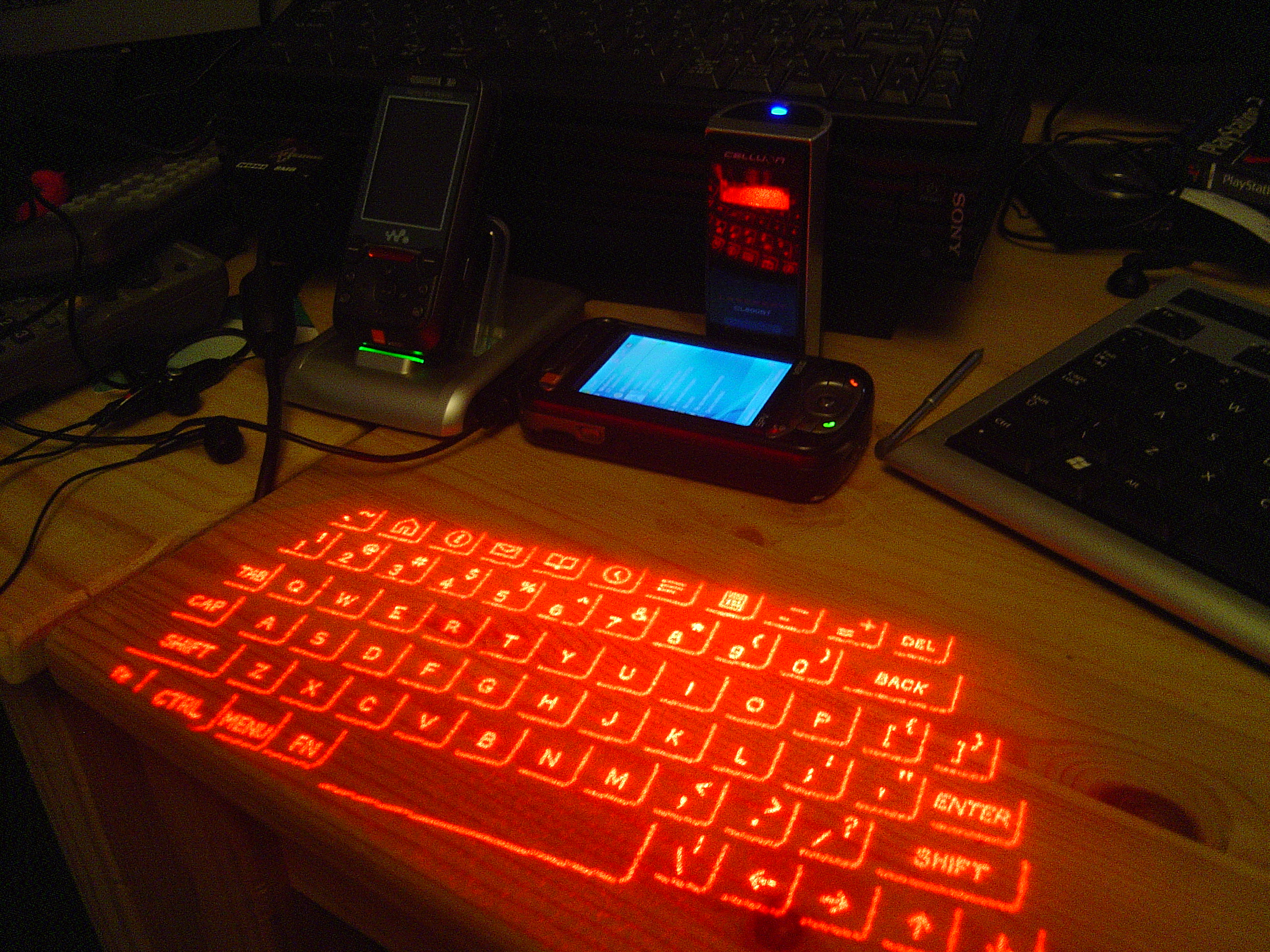
A projection keyboard

A projection keyboard is a form of computer input device whereby the image of a virtual keyboard is projected onto a surface: when a user touches the surface covered by an image of a key, the device records the corresponding keystroke. Some connect to Bluetooth devices, including many of the latest smartphone, tablet, and mini-PC devices with Android, iOS or Windows operating system.

== History ==
An optical virtual keyboard was invented and patented by IBM engineers in 1992. It optically detects and analyses human hand and finger motions and interprets them as operations on a physically non-existent input device like a surface with painted or projected keys. In that way, it can emulate unlimited types of manually operated input devices (such as a mouse, keyboard, and other devices). Mechanical input units can be replaced by such virtual devices, potentially optimized for a specific application and for the user's physiology, maintaining speed, simplicity, and unambiguity of manual data input.

In 2002, start-up company Canesta developed a projection keyboard using their proprietary "electronic perception technology." The company subsequently licensed the technology to Celluon of Korea.

A proposed system called the P-ISM combines the technology with a small video projector to create a portable computer the size of a fountain pen.

== Design ==
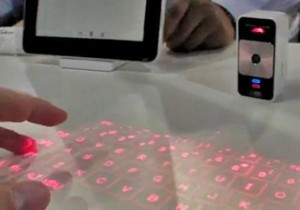
A laser projection keyboard used with a tablet

A laser or beamer projects visible virtual keyboard onto level surface. It is a modern input device. A sensor or camera in the projector picks up finger movements. Software converts the coordinates to identify actions or characters.

Some devices project a second (invisible infrared) beam above the virtual keyboard. The user's finger makes a keystroke on the virtual keyboard. This breaks the infrared beam and reflects light back to the projector. The reflected beam passes through an infrared filter to the camera. The camera photographs the angle of incoming infrared light. The sensor chip determines where infrared beam was broken. Software determines the action or character to be generated.

The projection is realized in four main steps and via three modules: projection module, sensor module and illumination module. The main devices and technologies used to project the image are a diffractive optical element, red laser diode, CMOS sensor chip and an infrared (IR) laser diode.

=== Template projection ===
A template produced by a specially designed and highly efficient projection element with a red diode laser is projected onto the adjacent interface surface. The template is not however involved in the detection process.

== Reference plane illumination ==
An infra-red plane of light is generated on the interface surface. The plane is however situated just above and parallel to the surface. The light is invisible to the user and hovers a few millimeters above the surface. When a key position is touched on the surface interface, the light is reflected from the infra-red plane in the vicinity of the key and directed towards the sensor module.

=== Map reflection coordinates ===
The reflected light user interactions with the interface surface is passed through an infra-red filter and imaged on to a CMOS image sensor in the sensor module. The sensor chip has a custom hardware embedded such as the Virtual Interface Processing Core and it is capable of making a real-time determination of the location from where the light was reflected. The processing core may track not only one, but multiple light reflections at the same time and it can support multiple keystrokes and overlapping cursor control inputs.

=== Interpretation and communication ===
The micro-controller in the sensor module receives the positional information corresponding to the light flashes from the sensor processing core, interprets the events and then communicates them through the appropriate interface to external devices. By events it is understood any key stroke, mouse or touchpad control.

Most projection keyboards use a red diode laser as a light source and may project a full size QWERTY keyboard. The projected keyboard size is usually 295 mm x 95 mm and it is projected at a distance of 60 mm from the virtual keyboard unit. The projection keyboard detects up to 400 characters per minute.

== Connectivity ==
Projection keyboards connect to the computer either through Bluetooth or USB.

Bluetooth dongle technology enables the projection keyboard for point to multi-point connectivity with other Bluetooth devices, such as PCs, PDAs and mobile phones.

The way that Bluetooth projection keyboards connect to devices depends on the specific tablet, phone or computer.

== Alternative uses ==
Apart from simply being used to type, some laser keyboard systems can function as a virtual mouse or even as a virtual piano, such as the crowd-funded iKeybo.
