= Canesta =

Canesta Ltd
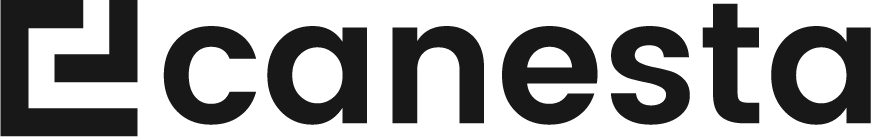
- Type: Subsidiary
- Industry: Fabless Semiconductor
- Founded: 1999
- Headquarters: Los Angeles, California, US
- Key people: Jim Spare, CEO; Abbas Rafii, Executive VP; Cyrus Bamji, CTO; Patrick O'Connor, VP Eng. Tim Droz, VP Platform Eng. Tony Zuccarino, VP Mktg/Sales; Sakuya Morimoto, Sr. Dir. Asia; Albert Lee, VP Finance
- Products: 3D CMOS Image sensors
- Owner: Microsoft Corporation
- Number of employees: 60+ (2010)
- Website: www.canesta.com

Canesta was a fabless semiconductor company that was founded in April 1999, by Cyrus Bamji, Abbas Rafii, and Nazim Kareemi.

The company manufactured CMOS-based single chip 3D sensors, which can be used as part of input systems for electronic devices.

On October 29, 2010, Canesta announced that it would be acquired by Microsoft for an undisclosed amount.

== History ==
The company launched publicly at PC Forum in 2002, where it also announced its CMOS-based single chip 3D image sensing technology using the time of flight principle. Described as “electronic perception technology", the company promotes its technology as enabling everyday machines and digital devices with the ability to “see”.

In 2002, at Demo Mobile, the company announced its first application, a projection keyboard for mobile devices. In this application, a keyboard made of light is projected onto a flat surface, the user types on the flat surface, and Canesta's electronic perception technology translates finger movements into keystrokes in the device. The company subsequently licensed the technology to Celluon of Korea.

The company later focused on the automotive applications of its technology, securing investment from Honda, and promoting its technology at public automotive industry forums such as Convergence 2006. Interior occupant sensing for advanced airbag deployment and rear obstacle detection are two example applications.

The company turned its attention to the video game space where its technology forms the basis of an input mechanism that enables immersive game experiences.

On October 29, 2010, it was announced that Microsoft would acquire Canesta for an undisclosed amount, stating that their partnership would assist in the development of natural user interfaces and spread the adoption of their technology into a wider array of products. Microsoft had developed a motion controller for its Xbox 360 game console, using PrimeSense technology and the current Kinect for Xbox One switched over to the Canesta Time-of-flight camera core technology.

== Finances ==
The company has raised $70 Million to date in subsequent rounds of investment.

The company's investors include The Carlyle Group, Venrock Associates, KGIF, Hotung Capital, Honda Motor Company, Ltd., Optex, Ltd., Quanta Computer Inc. (2382.TW), and SMSC (NASDAQ: SMSC).

== Products ==
Canesta provides its electronic perception technology in the form of CMOS 3D image sensors to multiple original equipment manufacturer (OEM) markets, including consumer electronics, video gaming, automotive, security, and industrial.

As of Q3 2010, the latest generation of Canesta sensor was the 'Cobra' 3D ToF CMOS sensor. This sensor uses a standard CMOS image sensor process and has a ToF pixel array with XY resolution of 320x200. The range accuracy is characterized by the noise around the correct range data, and in this 'Cobra' device, this noise is around the single digit millimeter.

The company also provides reference designs, functioning sensor modules, and developer's toolkits.

== Technology ==
Canesta's time-of-flight technology consists of an array of pixels where every pixel can independently determine the distance to the object it sees. This array is in effect a massively parallel LIDAR on a single CMOS chip. At the heart of the technology is a proprietary silicon photo collection structure in each pixel that allows accurate measurement of the arrival time of the collected photons. This photo collection structure is substantially immune to CMOS surface defects that ordinarily adversely affect time of flight operation. This enables time of flight ranging using a low cost CMOS process.

Using Canesta technology a 3D time-of-flight camera can be constructed from a Canesta CMOS time of flight sensor, an imaging lens to focus the light from the scene onto the sensor and an LED or laser diode based light source controlled by the sensor to illuminate the scene with near infrared light.
