= MESA Imaging =

Swiss time-of-flight camera company

MESA Imaging AG
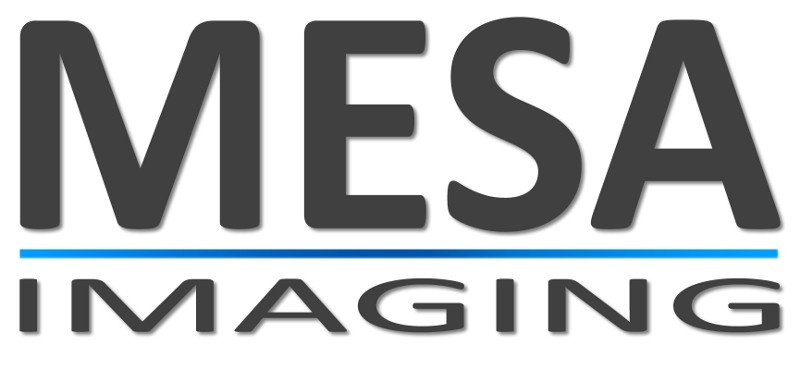
- Industry: Fabless Semiconductor
- Founded: 2006
- Headquarters: Zürich, Switzerland
- Products: 3D time-of-flight cameras
- Number of employees: 20+ (2009)
- Website: www.mesa-imaging.ch

MESA Imaging is a time-of-flight camera company. As privately financed organization, MESA was founded in July 2006 as a spin out from the Swiss Center for Electronics and Microtechnology (CSEM) to commercialize its time-of-flight camera technologies. As of 2009, its primary product line, the SwissRanger, is in its fourth generation with the SwissRanger SR4000. In 2014 MESA was bought by Heptagon

== Company profile ==
MESA Imaging is focusing on the development and production of 3D time-of-flight cameras. Development includes the design of the specific TOF-sensor as well as electronic, optical and mechanical design of the camera system. Beside a set of standard cameras, MESA also develops customer specific cameras for special purposes.

The headquarters of MESA Imaging is in the Technopark Zürich, Switzerland.

The MESA technology is well known for its high accuracy in per-pixel distance measurement as well as low noise. Both is achieved with a dedicated pixel architecture, the so-called Silo pixel. It delivers unique performances in terms of fast charge transport speed, low power consumption and high demodulation contrast.

== History ==
MESA Imaging AG was founded in 2006 as a spin-off company of the Centre Suisse d'Electronique et Microtechnique (CSEM). Before this, many years of research had already been spent on this new technology to enable it for the market.

In 2012, MESA Imaging has launched an online platform for the exchange on ideas, questions and comments on time-of-flight 3D imaging technology.

In 2014, MESA Imaging was bought by Heptagon.
