= Time of flight =

Timing of substance within a medium

Basic time-of-flight principles applied to laser range-finding

Time of flight (ToF) is the measurement of the time taken by an object, particle or wave (be it acoustic, electromagnetic, etc.) to travel a distance through a medium. This information can then be used to measure velocity or path length, or as a way to learn about the particle or medium's properties (such as composition or flow rate). The traveling object may be detected directly (direct time of flight, dToF, e.g., via an ion detector in mass spectrometry) or indirectly (indirect time of flight, iToF, e.g., by light scattered from an object in laser doppler velocimetry). Time of flight technology has found valuable applications in the monitoring and characterization of material and biomaterials, hydrogels included.

== Overview ==
In electronics, one of the earliest devices using the principle are ultrasonic distance-measuring devices, which emit an ultrasonic pulse and are able to measure the distance to a solid object based on the time taken for the wave to bounce back to the emitter. The ToF method is also used to estimate the electron mobility. Originally, it was designed for measurement of low-conductive thin films, later adjusted for common semiconductors. This experimental technique is used for metal-dielectric-metal structures as well as organic field-effect transistors. The excess charges are generated by application of the laser or voltage pulse.

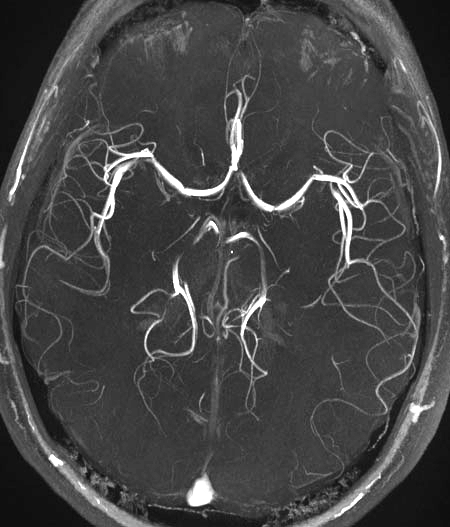
Magnetic resonance angiograph created by the ToF method

For magnetic resonance angiography (MRA), ToF is a major underlying method. In this method, blood entering the imaged area is not yet saturated, giving it a much higher signal when using short echo time and flow compensation. It can be used in the detection of aneurysm, stenosis or dissection.

In time-of-flight mass spectrometry, ions are accelerated by an electrical field to the same kinetic energy with the velocity of the ion depending on the mass-to-charge ratio. Thus the time-of-flight is used to measure velocity, from which the mass-to-charge ratio can be determined. The time-of-flight of electrons is used to measure their kinetic energy.

In near-infrared spectroscopy, the ToF method is used to measure the media-dependent optical pathlength over a range of optical wavelengths, from which composition and properties of the media can be analyzed.

In ultrasonic flow meter measurement, ToF is used to measure speed of signal propagation upstream and downstream of flow of a media, in order to estimate total flow velocity. This measurement is made in a collinear direction with the flow.

In planar Doppler velocimetry (optical flow meter measurement), ToF measurements are made perpendicular to the flow by timing when individual particles cross two or more locations along the flow (collinear measurements would require generally high flow velocities and extremely narrow-band optical filters).

In optical interferometry, the pathlength difference between sample and reference arms can be measured by ToF methods, such as frequency modulation followed by phase shift measurement or cross correlation of signals. Such methods are used in laser radar and laser tracker systems for medium-long range distance measurement.

In neutron time-of-flight scattering, a pulsed monochromatic neutron beam is scattered by a sample. The energy spectrum of the scattered neutrons is measured via time of flight.

In kinematics, ToF is the duration in which a projectile is traveling through the air. Given the initial velocity $u$ of a particle launched from the ground, the downward (i.e. gravitational) acceleration $a$, and the projectile's angle of projection θ (measured relative to the horizontal), then a simple rearrangement of the SUVAT equation

$$s = vt - \begin{matrix} \frac{1}{2} \end{matrix} at^2$$

results in this equation

$$t=\frac {2v \sin \theta} {a}$$

for the time of flight of a projectile.

== In mass spectrometry ==
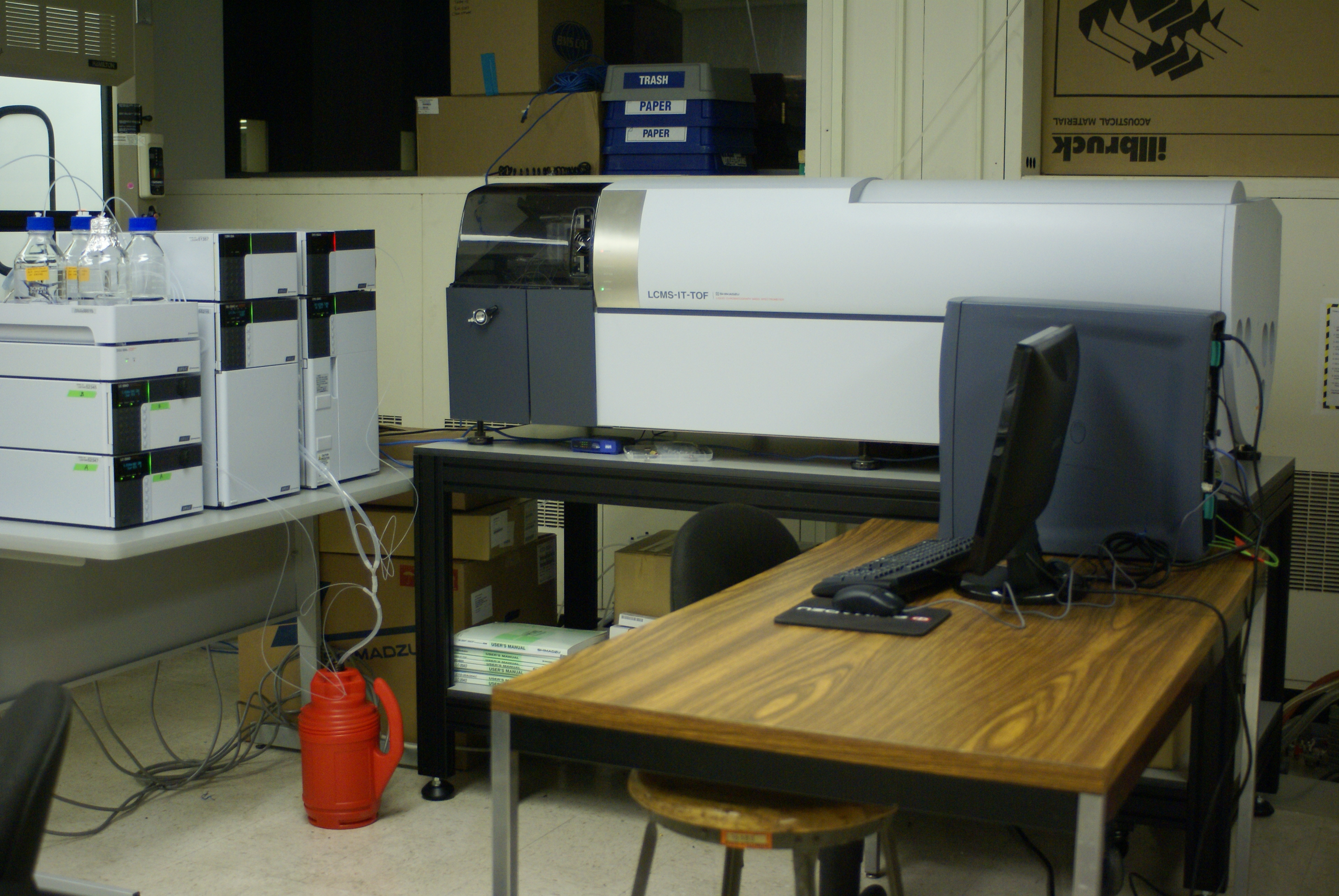
Shimadzu Ion Trap ToF

The time-of-flight principle can be applied for mass spectrometry. Ions are accelerated by an electric field of known strength. This acceleration results in an ion having the same kinetic energy as any other ion that has the same charge. The velocity of the ion depends on the mass-to-charge ratio. The time that it subsequently takes for the particle to reach a detector at a known distance is measured. This time will depend on the mass-to-charge ratio of the particle (heavier particles reach lower speeds). From this time and the known experimental parameters one can find the mass-to-charge ratio of the ion. The elapsed time from the instant a particle leaves a source to the instant it reaches a detector.

== In flow meters ==
An ultrasonic flow meter measures the velocity of a liquid or gas through a pipe using acoustic sensors. This has some advantages over other measurement techniques. The results are slightly affected by temperature, density or conductivity. Maintenance is inexpensive because there are no moving parts. Ultrasonic flow meters come in three different types: transmission (contrapropagating transit time) flowmeters, reflection (Doppler) flowmeters, and open-channel flowmeters. Transit time flowmeters work by measuring the time difference between an ultrasonic pulse sent in the flow direction and an ultrasound pulse sent opposite the flow direction. Doppler flowmeters measure the doppler shift resulting in reflecting an ultrasonic beam off either small particles in the fluid, air bubbles in the fluid, or the flowing fluid's turbulence. Open channel flow meters measure upstream levels in front of flumes or weirs.

Optical time-of-flight sensors consist of two light beams projected into the fluid whose detection is either interrupted or instigated by the passage of small particles (which are assumed to be following the flow). This is not dissimilar from the optical beams used as safety devices in motorized garage doors or as triggers in alarm systems. The speed of the particles is calculated by knowing the spacing between the two beams. If there is only one detector, then the time difference can be measured via autocorrelation. If there are two detectors, one for each beam, then direction can also be known. Since the location of the beams is relatively easy to determine, the precision of the measurement depends primarily on how small the setup can be made. If the beams are too far apart, the flow could change substantially between them, thus the measurement becomes an average over that space. Moreover, multiple particles could reside between them at any given time, and this would corrupt the signal since the particles are indistinguishable. For such a sensor to provide valid data, it must be small relative to the scale of the flow and the seeding density. MOEMS approaches yield extremely small packages, making such sensors applicable in a variety of situations.

== In physics ==
Usually the time-of-flight tube used in mass spectrometry is praised for simplicity, but for precision measurements of charged low energy particles the electric and the magnetic field in the tube has to be controlled within 10 mV and 1 nT respectively.

The work function homogeneity of the tube can be controlled by a Kelvin probe. The magnetic field can be measured by a fluxgate compass. High frequencies are passively shielded and damped by radar absorbent material. To generate arbitrary low frequencies field the screen is parted into plates (overlapping and connected by capacitors) with bias voltage on each plate and a bias current on coil behind plate whose flux is closed by an outer core. In this way the tube can be configured to act as a weak achromatic quadrupole lens with an aperture with a grid and a delay line detector in the diffraction plane to do angle resolved measurements. Changing the field the angle of the field of view can be changed and a deflecting bias can be superimposed to scan through all angles.

When no delay line detector is used focusing the ions onto a detector can be accomplished through the use of two or three einzel lenses placed in the vacuum tube located between the ion source and the detector.

The sample should be immersed into the tube with holes and apertures for and against stray light to do magnetic experiments and to control the electrons from their start.

== Camera ==
Time of flight of a light pulse reflecting off a target

A time-of-flight camera (ToF camera), also known as time-of-flight sensor (ToF sensor), is a range imaging camera system for measuring distances between the camera and the subject for each point of the image based on time-of-flight, the round trip time of an artificial light signal, as provided by a laser or an LED. Laser-based time-of-flight cameras are part of a broader class of scannerless LIDAR, in which the entire scene is captured with each laser pulse, as opposed to point-by-point with a laser beam such as in scanning LIDAR systems. The first time-of-flight camera products for civil applications emerged around 2000, as the semiconductor processes allowed the production of components fast enough for such devices. The systems cover ranges of a few centimeters up to several kilometers.

== Detector ==
A time-of-flight (TOF) detector is a particle detector which can discriminate between a lighter and a heavier elementary particle of same momentum using their time of flight between two scintillators. The first of the scintillators activates a clock upon being hit while the other stops the clock upon being hit. If the two masses are denoted by $m_1$and $m_2$ and have velocities $v_1$ and $v_2$ then the time of flight difference is given by

$$\Delta t = L\left(\frac{1}{v_1}-\frac{1}{v_2}\right)\approx \frac{Lc}{2p^2}(m_1^2-m_2^2)$$

where $L$ is the distance between the scintillators. The approximation is in the relativistic limit at momentum $p$ and $c$ denotes the speed of light in vacuum.

== See also ==
- Propagation delay
- Round-trip time
- Time of arrival
- Time of transmission
- Time-to-digital converter
