= Ifm group =

German automation technology company

Ifm Group

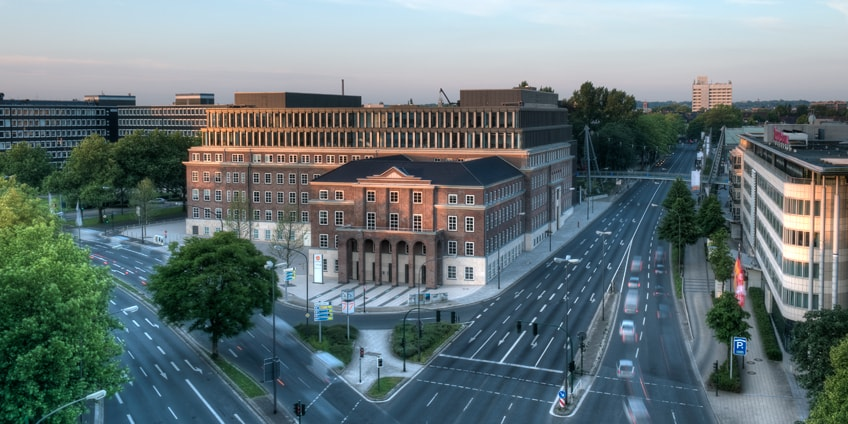
- Ifm Headquarters in Essen
- Type: Privately held company (SE & Co. KG)
- Industry: Conglomerate
- Founded: 26 October 1967; 59 years ago Essen, Germany
- Founder: Robert Buck; Gerd Marhofer
- Headquarters: Essen, Germany
- Area served: Worldwide
- Key people: Michael Marhofer (CEO); Martin Buck (Deputy CEO); Volker Frey (CTO); Christoph von Rosenberg (CFO); Dirk Kristes (COO)
- Products: industrial automation, software, sensor systems
- Revenue: ▲€1,37 billion (2024)
- Number of employees: 9,120 (2026)
- Subsidiaries: PMD Technologies
- Website: ifm.com

The Ifm Group (stylized as ifm group) is a German automation technology company, specialized in components for industrial companies. Its headquarters are located Essen, Germany. The company is considered the inventor of inductive proximity sensors.

== History ==
Ifm was founded in 1969 by electrical engineer Robert Buck and salesman Gerd Marhofer under the name Ifm electronic geräte gmbh+co kg. Buck and Marhofer had worked together in the development and marketing of non-contact sensors. In the same year, Buck and Marhofer introduced inductive proximity sensors under the name efector to the market. In the early years, Bernd Rüsing also served as managing director but left the company in 1971. In the following years, the company grew and expanded into different countries. While having 16 employees in 1970 and sales of 409,000 euros, the company had 260 employees in 1983 and subsidiaries in six different locations, generating 14,8 million in sales.

Ifm attracted national attention when an attempt was made to bug the company's stand at Interkama trade fair in 1972 in a case of industrial espionage. The following year, Ifm introduced the first electronic speed monitor. In 1990, Ifm published its company philosophy as hardcover book available for all employees. By now, the book has been translated into 16 languages.

== 2000 to 2020 ==
In 2001, Ifm underwent its first generational change with Martin Buck and Michael Marhofer, the sons of the founders, taking over the management after spending five years in a probationary period. By that moment, Robert Buck and Gerd Marhofer immediately stepped away. With him still being connected to the company, Robert Buck died in 2016 after having been responsible for over 650 patents during his lifespan. In 2015, Ifm efector opened its North American headquarters in the Atwater Corporate Center, in Malvern, Pennsylvania. The following year, Barack Obama and Angela Merkel visited the Ifm booth at Hannover Messe fair, where they attracted attention trying on Virtual Reality goggles. In 2018, the Lighthouse smart home camera was introduced to the market making it possible to distinguish between adults, children and pets. That same year, Ifm started construction of The Summit in Siegen, which is now home to four Ifm subsidiaries. The following year, Ifm celebrated its 50th anniversary by reaching a group turnover of 1 billion euros for the first time.

== Since 2020 ==
In 2022, Ifm built a green factory in Sibiu, Romania. The same year, the company generated 1.3 billion euros in sales. During COVID-19 pandemic, Ifm efector became one of the key suppliers of medical consumables and components in the US. As of 2024, Ifm produced over 18.3 million products, including 9 million sensors annually. The company had more than 8.750 employees in more than 80 countries and 70 subsidiaries worldwide. In April 2024 it was reported that Ifm signed an agreement with US company Microsoft to develop solutions based on Microsoft Azure.

In 2025, it was reported by German newspaper Westdeutsche Allgemeine Zeitung that Ifm is primarily growing in international markets. For economic reasons, the company has not yet implemented its plan to build the new company headquarters on the former RWE site in Essen.
