= PMD Technologies =

German company using photonic mixer devices

- Formerly: S-Tec (since 1996)
- Industry: Fabless Semiconductor
- Founded: 2002
- Founders: Prof. Dr. Rudolf Schwarte [ de ], Audi Electronics Venture GmbH
- Successor: IFM Efector GmbH
- Headquarters: Siegen, Germany
- Key people: Prof. Dr. Bernd Buxbaum; Michael Paintner
- Products: 3D CMOS Image sensors
- Number of employees: 150 (2021)
- Parent: IFM Group
- Website: www.pmdtec.com

PMD Technologies GmbhH (stylised as pmdtechnologies gmbh) was a developer of CMOS semiconductor 3D time-of-flight (ToF) components and a provider of engineering support in the field of digital 3D imaging. The company was named after the Photonic Mixer Device (PMD) technology used in its products to detect 3D data in real time. The corporate headquarters of the company was located in Siegen, Germany. The company was merged in June 2026 into IFM Efector.

== History ==
PMD Technologies was founded in 2002 by Rudolf Schwarte and the Audi Electronics Venture GmbH as a spin-off of the Center for Sensor Systems (ZESS) at the University of Siegen, Germany. It was the result of over 10 years of scientific research on 3D ToF imaging. Another ZESS spin-off, S-Tec Sensor GmbH, founded in 1996, began developing PMD products in 1997. This company was acquired by PMD Technologies in 2002.

Basic patents for TOF-chips with new Photomischelemente (i.e. Photonic Mixer Elements resp. Devices) were filed in 1996 onwards by Prof. Rudolf Schwarte. A 3D Depth Camera with Time of Flight PMD sensors was available in the year 2000.

In 2002, together with three other nominees, the developing team of PMD Technologies, represented by Rudolf Schwarte, Bernd Buxbaum, and Torsten Gollewski was nominated for the German Future Prize, which is issued by the President of Germany, at that time Johannes Rau.

At the Hanover Fair in 2005 PMD Technologies was awarded with the innovation prize called Hermes Award for its Efector PMD.

In 2009, PMD Technologies received the 2009 European Real-Time 3D Imaging Enabling Technology Innovation Award by Frost & Sullivan.

PMD Technologies took part in Google's Project Tango in 2015. Resulting in the first Lenovo device being released in 2016 with PMD's 3D technology.

In 2019, new offices were opened in Seoul, Korea and Shanghai, China.

In late June 2026, PMD Technologies' holding company, PMD Holding GmbH, was merged into IFM Efector GmbH as part of a corporate restructuring. Following the merger, the PMD Holding brand name and distinct corporate identity (including PMD Holding's subsidiaries, PMD Technologies and PMD Industrial) were discontinued and integrated into IFM Efector. The management team of the expanded IFM Efector remains the same, led by Managing Directors Dr. Volker Frey, Michael Paintner, and Stefan Hoberg.

== Products ==
After initially focusing on industrial applications, PMD Technologies began to spread its application areas into other fields, including the automotive sector, consumer electronics, gaming, security & surveillance, medical technology and live sciences.

In 2013 PMD Technologies cooperated with Infineon Technologies to produce 3D image sensor chips for touchless gesture recognition.

PMD sensors are used in the exteroceptive sensor suite of NASA's robot Valkyrie.

The autonomous humanoid robot Justin by the German Aerospace Center (DLR) is equipped with PMD-sensors.

A collaboration between PMD and Infineon Technologies resulted in a 3D iToF technology which was used in the Magic Leap 2.

In 2023 PMD and Infineon Technologies launched the IRS2976C, a ToF VGA sensor, which was the first sensor to be located under the display and to pass Google's Class 3 Face ID certification.
