= Dual photography =

Dual photography is a photographic technique that uses Helmholtz reciprocity to capture the light field of all light paths from a structured illumination source to a camera. Image processing software can then be used to reconstruct the scene as it would have been seen from the viewpoint of the projector.

== See also ==
- Light-field camera
