= Sony Depthsensing Solutions =

Belgian software company

Sony Depthsensing Solutions SA/NV
- Formerly: SoftKinetic
- Type: Subsidiary
- Industry: Software, semiconductors
- Founded: September 2009; 16 years ago
- Founder: Maarten Kuijk, André Miodezky, Eric Krzeslo, Xavier Baele, Ward Van der Tempel, Riemer Grootjans, Tomas Van den Hauwe, Thibaud Remacle, Gilles Pinault, Daniël Van Nieuwenhove
- Headquarters: Auderghem, Belgium
- Products: iisu, DepthSense, CMOS Pixel
- Number of employees: 51-200
- Parent: Sony Semiconductor Solutions
- Website: https://www.sony-depthsensing.com

Sony Depthsensing Solutions SA/NV, formerly known as SoftKinetic Systems, is a Belgian company originating from the merger of Optrima NV, founded by André Miodezky, Maarten Kuijk, Daniël Van Nieuwenhove, Ward Van der Tempel, Riemer Grootjans and Tomas Van den Hauwe and SoftKinetic SA founded by Eric Krzeslo, Thibaud Remacle, Gilles Pinault and Xavier Baele. Sony Depthsensing Solutions develops gesture recognition hardware and software for real-time range imaging (3D) cameras (such as time-of-flight cameras). SoftKinetic was founded in July 2007 providing gesture recognition solutions based on its technology to the interactive digital entertainment, consumer electronics, health & fitness, and serious game industries. SoftKinetic technology has been applied to interactive digital signage and advergaming, interactive television, and physical therapy.

Originally centered on providing software development kits and middleware, SoftKinetic branched out into internal game and application development with the establishment of SoftKinetic Studios in September 2009. SoftKinetic then progressed into hardware, partnering with time-of-flight camera developer Optrima in September 2010, with the two companies merging into a reformed SoftKinetic Systems by March 2011.

SoftKinetic's gesture recognition software platform, named iisu, can recognize and distinguish or isolate different scenic elements, can identify and track the body parts of a user, and can adapt the user's shape, posture, and movements to an existing physical model, and vice versa. iisu is compatible with all major real-time range imaging cameras, and the middleware guards developers against the particularities of the hardware.

SoftKinetic's hardware, named DepthSense (formerly OptriCam), is a line of 3D time-of-flight imagers based on patented CMOS sensor and time-of-flight (TOF) technologies. Based on Current Assisted Photonic Demodulation (CAPD), the company's patented CMOS pixel technology, DepthSense hardware products range from sensors to consumer and professional 3D cameras.

SoftKinetic Studios has collaborated on numerous gesture recognition-based projects for various platforms such as PC, consoles, set-top boxes, arcade, and interactive digital signage; with companies such as Orange Vallée and Fuel Industries.

On 8 October 2015, Sony Corporation announced the acquisition of the company.

In December 2017, Softkinetic was renamed to Sony Depthsensing Solutions.
