= Laser Dynamic Range Imager =

The Laser Dynamic Range Imager (LDRI) is a LIDAR range imaging device developed by Sandia National Laboratories for the US Space Shuttle program. The sensor was developed as part of NASA's "Return to Flight" effort following the Space Shuttle Columbia disaster to provide 2D and 3D images of the thermal protection system on the Space Shuttle Orbiter.

The LDRI generates three-dimensional images from two-dimensional video. Modulated laser illumination is demodulated by the receive optics, and the resulting video sequences can be processed to produce 3D images. The modulation produces a flickering effect from frame-to-frame in the video imagery.

As part of the Orbiter Boom Sensor System, the LDRI is mounted at the end of the boom on a pan-tilt unit (PTU) along with an intensified video camera (ITVC). During 2-dimensional imaging of the reinforced carbon-carbon panels on the leading edge of the shuttle's wings, the LDRI is capable of seeing damage as small as a 0.020 in (0.51 mm) crack.

During the mission STS-114, the LDRI was used to obtain 3D measurements of a loose gap filler on the underside of the orbiter. The LDRI also flew on the subsequent mission, STS-121. On this mission, NASA TV broadcast live raw video from the LDRI of the entire wing leading edge and nosecap surveys on flight day 2.

An earlier version of the LDRI originally flew as a DTO on STS-97.
