= SBMC =

SBMC may refer to:

- Saint Barnabas Medical Center, a non-profit major teaching hospital located in Livingston, New Jersey.
- Sher-e-Bangla Medical College, a public medical college located in Barisal, a city in Bangladesh
- Soldier Borne Mission Command, a follow up progarm to the Integrated Visual Augmentation System
