= Project Milo =

Video game project

- Demonstration of human interaction with Milo
- Developer: Lionhead Studios
- Publisher: Microsoft Studios
- Producers: Gary Carr; Geoff Smith; Jemma Harris
- Designer: Peter Molyneux
- Platform: Xbox 360

Project Milo (also referred to as Milo and Kate) was a project in development by Lionhead Studios for the Xbox 360 video game console. Formerly a secretive project under the early codename "Dimitri", Project Milo was unveiled at the 2009 Electronic Entertainment Expo (E3) in a demonstration for Kinect, as a "controller-free" entertainment initiative for the Xbox 360 based on depth-sensing and pattern recognition technologies. The project was a tech demo to showcase the capabilities of Kinect and was not released, despite conflicting reports that the project was an actual game.

== Development ==
The project began as work on an "emotional AI (artificial intelligence)" after Lionhead had finished work on Black & White in 2001. The project was code named Dimitri, after the godson of Lionhead creative director Peter Molyneux. Details revealed about the project led some to speculate that "Dimitri" had become Fable II, but a 2006 interview with Molyneux confirmed that the projects were separate. For several years the development of Dimitri remained "experimental", resulting in scarce news updates during this phase of development. In later interviews, Molyneux began to refer to the project as "Project X".

During their press briefing at the Electronic Entertainment Expo in June 2009, Lionhead's parent company Microsoft unveiled Kinect, then known as Project Natal, during which it featured a presentation clip from Molyneux demonstrating a woman naturally interacting with a virtual character, referred to as "Milo." In an interview with Eurogamer after the press conference, Molyneux confirmed that the demonstration was of the previously-known "Dimitri," and would be a game developed around Kinect, titled Milo and Kate. In the game, players would interact with a 10-year-old child (Milo or Millie, selected at the start) and a dog named Kate, playing through a story. According to Molyneux, work on the Kinect-specific elements started in December 2008. The game would also feature an in-game store, for purchasing items to enhance gameplay.

Milo had an AI structure that responded to human interactions, such as spoken word, gestures, or predefined actions in dynamic situations. The game relied on a procedural generation system which was constantly updating a built-in "dictionary" that was capable of matching key words in conversations with inherent voice-acting clips to simulate lifelike conversations. Molyneux claimed that the technology for the game was developed while working on Fable and Black & White.

However, the game was not present at Microsoft's E3 press briefing the following year. Further confusion arose later in the month with a statement by Microsoft's Aaron Greenberg stating that the game was not a product they were planning to bring to market, but was more of an internal tech demo. This was later refuted by Molyneux who stated that he would reveal a more advanced version of Milo during his TEDGlobal talk in Oxford in July 2010. Molyneux went on to hint at difficulties in getting Microsoft to see Milo as a full game. Molyneux said "The biggest challenge for us is convincing people (Microsoft) what we're doing is actually going to work, is going to reach a new audience, is going to be an idea that people love." At the TED conference in Oxford in July 2010, more footage was shown. Players could make crucial decisions in Milo's life, or smaller ones such as squashing a snail or not. During the conference it was shown that Milo could be taught how to skip stones. The demonstration also indicated that users were only able to talk to Milo when a red microphone image appeared on the screen.

In September 2010, Eurogamer ran a story, citing an unnamed source, stating that work on Milo had been halted, and that the Milo tech would be used in a "Fable themed Kinect game". This story was seemingly backed up by Microsoft's Alex Kipman in a November 2010 interview with Gamesindustry.biz, declaring that Project Milo "was never a product" and "was never announced as a game". However, an interview with the drama director of the game was released in March. It showed part of the creation process that he had to go through and some brief sections of gameplay. Completion of the project was also hinted in the interview. Molyneux later stated in a May 2025 interview that when they first started work on Project Milo, they were basing it on the capabilities of the prototype Kinect; as Microsoft refined the device, they discovered each Kinect unit would have cost thousands of dollars, well beyond expectations for consumers. Microsoft subsequently cut back on the Kinect capabilities and to focus on more casual games that use motion controls. According to Molyneux "Then, the death blow of Milo, which still breaks my heart to this day, was that it was decided that Kinect shouldn't be a gaming device: it should be a party device. You should play a sports game with it, or dancing games with it. So, it just didn't fit into the Microsoft portfolio, and unfortunately the project was cancelled."

At the 2011 Game Developer's Conference, Lionhead lead programmer Ben Sugden showcased a new graphics technology used in Project Milo for upcoming Xbox 360 titles. At E3 2011, Fable: The Journey was announced, which includes elements from Milo, including voice and emotion recognition. In a May 2012 interview with Eurogamer, Lionhead creative director Gary Carr confirmed that a number of Kinect features from Project Milo had been implemented in Fable: The Journey.
