= OpenNI =

Non-profit organization and software project

OpenNI or Open Natural Interaction is an industry-led non-profit organization and open source software project focused on certifying and improving interoperability of natural user interfaces and organic user interfaces for Natural Interaction (NI) devices, applications that use those devices and middleware that facilitates access and use of such devices.

PrimeSense, who was founding member of OpenNI, shutdown the original OpenNI project when it was acquired by Apple on November 24, 2013; since then Occipital and other former partners of PrimeSense are still keeping a forked version of OpenNI 2 (OpenNI version 2) active as an open source software, primary for their own Structure SDK (Software Development Kit) which is used by their Structure Product.

== History ==
The organization was created in November 2010, with the website going public on December 8. One of the main members was PrimeSense, the company behind the technology used in the Kinect, a motion sensing input device by Microsoft for the Xbox 360 video game console.

In December 2010, PrimeSense, whose depth sensing reference design Kinect is based on, released their own open source drivers along with motion tracking middleware called NITE. PrimeSense later announced that it had teamed up with Asus to develop a PC-compatible device similar to Kinect, which would be called Wavi Xtion and was scheduled for release in the second quarter of 2012.

Their software is currently being used in a variety of open-source projects among academia and the hobbyist community. Recently, software companies have attempted to expand OpenNI's influence by making working with and integrating the technology dramatically simpler.

After the acquisition of PrimeSense by Apple, it was announced that the website OpenNI.org would be shut down on April 23, 2014. Immediately after the shutdown, organizations that used OpenNI subsequently preserved documentation and binaries for future use. Today, Occipital and other former partners of PrimeSense is still keeping a forked version of OpenNI 2 (OpenNI version 2) active as an open source software for their Structure SDK for their Structure Product.

== Natural Interaction Devices ==
Natural Interaction Devices or Natural Interfaces are devices that capture body movements and sounds to allow for a more natural interaction of users with computers in the context of a Natural user interface. The Kinect and Wavi X-tion are examples of such devices.

== OpenNI Framework ==
The OpenNI framework provides a set of open source APIs. These APIs are intended to become a standard for applications to access natural interaction devices. The API framework itself is also sometimes referred to by the name OpenNI SDK.

The APIs provide support for

- Voice and voice command recognition
- Hand gestures
- Body Motion Tracking

== Organization ==
=== Pioneering Members ===
- PrimeSense - Natural Interaction & 3D Sensing
- Willow Garage - personal robotics applications
- ASUS - hardware manufacturer for full body motion apps and games

=== Middleware Partners ===
- FORTH ICS – Institute of Computer Science
- TipTep
- University of Southern California– 3D Face Modeling & Recognition
- Ayotle – Vision Software
- SigmaRD

=== Camera Partners ===
- LIPS - Provider of Time-of-Flight (ToF), Stereo, and Structure Light based 3D cameras that support OpenNI

== See also ==
- Natural user interface
- Organic user interface
- Kinect (previously known as Project Natal) and PrimeSense
