= Microsoft HoloLens =

Mixed reality smartglasses

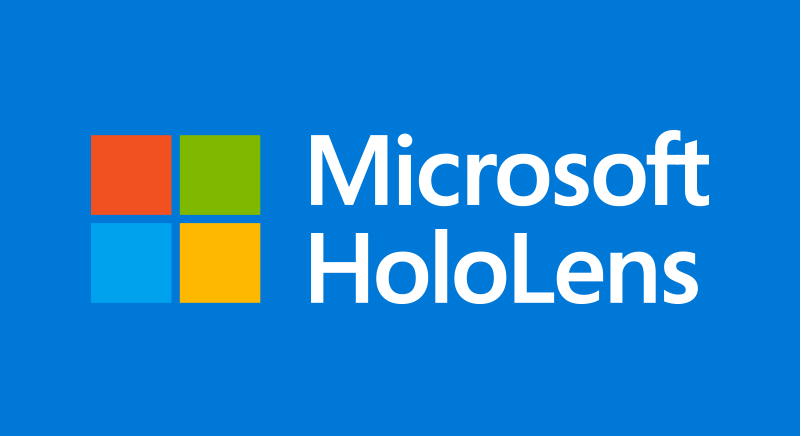

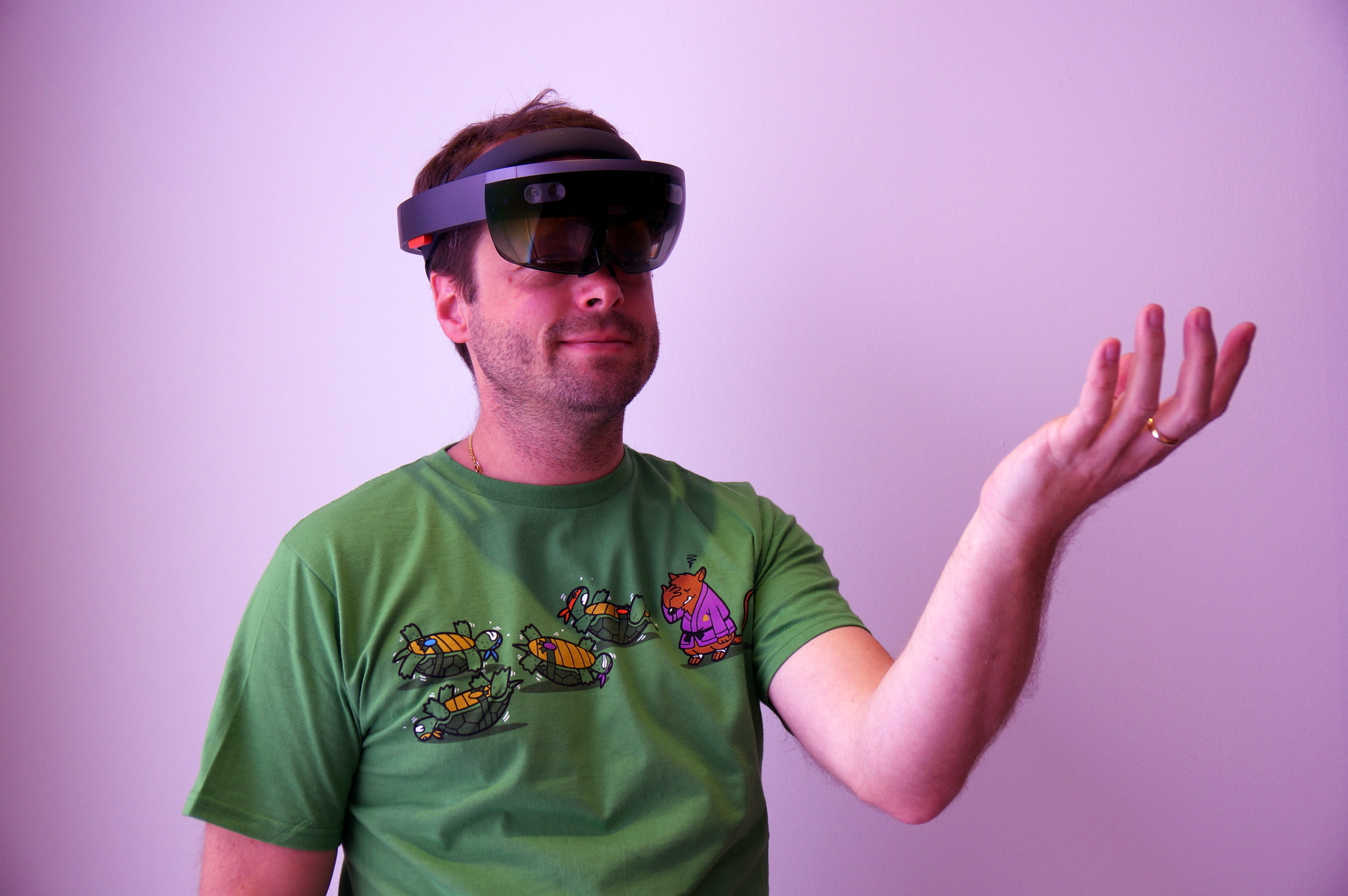
- Also known as: Project Baraboo (during the development period)
- Developer: Microsoft
- Manufacturer: Microsoft
- Product family: Windows 10
- Type: Mixed reality augmented reality head-mounted display smartglasses
- Generation: 2
- Released: March 30, 2016 (Development Edition); (Development Edition 2) announced May 2, 2019: N/A (Consumer version)
- Introductory price: $3,000 $5,000 (Commercial Suite)
- Operating system: Windows Mixed Reality
- CPU: Intel Atom x5-Z8100 (1GHz)
- Memory: 2 GB RAM; 1 GB HPU RAM
- Storage: 64 GB (flash memory)
- Display: 2.3 megapixel widescreen head-mounted display
- Sound: Spatial sound technology
- Input: Inertial measurement unit (Accelerometer, gyroscope, and magnetometer); 4 sensors; 1 120°×120° depth camera
- Controller input: Gestural commands via sensors
- Camera: 2.4 MP
- Touchpad: Side Panel
- Connectivity: IEEE 802.11ac; Bluetooth 4.1; LE
- Weight: 579 g (1.28 lb)
- Successor: HoloLens 2
- Website: learn.microsoft.com/en-us/hololens/

Microsoft HoloLens is an augmented reality (AR)/mixed reality (MR) headset developed and manufactured by Microsoft. HoloLens runs the Windows Mixed Reality platform under the Windows 10 operating system. Some of the positional tracking technology used in HoloLens can trace its lineage to the Microsoft Kinect, an accessory for Microsoft's Xbox 360 and Xbox One game consoles that was introduced in 2010.

The pre-production version of HoloLens, the Development Edition, shipped on March 30, 2016, and is targeted to developers in the United States and Canada for a list price of US$3,000, which allowed hobbyist, professionals and corporations to participate in the pre-production version of HoloLens. Samsung and Asus have extended an offer to Microsoft to help produce their own mixed-reality products, in collaboration with Microsoft, based around the concept and hardware on HoloLens. On October 12, 2016, Microsoft announced global expansion of HoloLens and publicized that HoloLens would be available for preorder in Australia, Ireland, France, Germany, New Zealand and the United Kingdom. There is also a commercial suite (similar to a pro edition of Windows), with enterprise features such as BitLocker security. As of May 2017, the suite sold for US$5,000.

HoloLens 2 was announced at the Mobile World Congress (MWC) in Barcelona, Spain, on February 24, 2019, and was available on preorder at US$3,500.

== Description ==
The HoloLens is a head-mounted display unit connected to an adjustable, cushioned inner headband, which can tilt HoloLens up and down, as well as forward and backward. To wear the unit, the user fits the HoloLens on their head, using an adjustment wheel at the back of the headband to secure it around the crown, supporting and distributing the weight of the unit equally for comfort, before tilting the visor towards the front of the eyes.

The front of the unit houses many of the sensors and related hardware, including the processors, cameras and projection lenses. The visor is tinted; enclosed in the visor piece is a pair of transparent combiner lenses, in which the projected images are displayed in the lower half. The HoloLens must be calibrated to the interpupillary distance (IPD) or accustomed vision of the user.

Along the bottom edges of the side, located near the user's ears, are a pair of small, red 3D audio speakers. The speakers, competing against typical sound systems, do not obstruct external sounds, allowing the user to hear virtual sounds, along with the environment. Using head-related transfer functions, the HoloLens generates binaural audio, which can simulate spatial effects; meaning the user, virtually, can perceive and locate a sound, as though it is coming from a virtual pinpoint or location. (Note: See also: 3D audio effect, virtual surround, psychoacoustics)

On the top edge are two pairs of buttons: display brightness buttons above the left ear and volume buttons above the right ear. Adjacent buttons are shaped differently—one concave, one convex—so that the user can distinguish them by touch.

At the end of the left arm is a power button and row of five, small individual LED nodes, used to indicate system status, as well as for power management, indicating battery level and setting power/standby mode. A USB 2.0 micro-B receptacle is located along the bottom edge. A 3.5 mm audio jack is located along the bottom edge of the right arm.

== Hardware ==
The HoloLens is a first generation augmented reality device. The displays on the HoloLens are simple waveguide displays with a fixed focus of approximately two meters. Because of the fixed focus, the displays exhibit the vergence-accommodation conflict.

The HoloLens features an inertial measurement unit (IMU) (which includes an accelerometer, gyroscope and a magnetometer), four "environment understanding" sensors (two on each side), an energy-efficient depth camera with a 120°×120° angle of view, a 2.4-megapixel photographic video camera, a four-microphone array and an ambient light sensor.

The main input device is a handheld Clicker, a thumb-sized finger-operated input device that can be used for interface scrolling and selecting. The Clicker features a clickable surface for selecting and an orientation sensor, which provides for scrolling functions via tilting and panning of the unit. The Clicker features an elastic finger loop for holding the device and a USB 2.0 micro-B receptacle for charging its internal battery.

In addition to an Intel Cherry Trail SoC containing the CPU and GPU, HoloLens features a custom-made Microsoft Holographic Processing Unit (HPU), a coprocessor manufactured specifically for the HoloLens by Microsoft. The SoC and the HPU each have 1GB LPDDR3 and share 8MB SRAM, with the SoC also controlling 64GB eMMC and running the Windows 10 operating system. The HPU uses 28 custom DSPs from Tensilica to process and integrate data from the sensors, as well as handling tasks such as spatial mapping, gesture recognition and voice and speech recognition. According to Alex Kipman, the HPU processes "terabytes of information." One attendee estimated that the display field of view of the demonstration units was 30°×17.5°. In an interview at the 2015 Electronic Entertainment Expo in June, Microsoft Vice-President of Next-Gen Experiences, Kudo Tsunoda, indicated that the field of view is unlikely to be significantly different on release of the current version.

The HoloLens contains an internal rechargeable battery, with average life rated at 2–3 hours of active use, or 2 weeks of standby time. The HoloLens can be operated while charging.

HoloLens features IEEE 802.11ac Wi-Fi and Bluetooth 4.1 Low Energy (LE) wireless connectivity. The headset uses Bluetooth LE to pair with the included Clicker.

The HoloLens has been integrated into hard hat hardware systems.

== Applications ==
Since 2016, a number of augmented-reality applications have been showcased for the HoloLens. Some of the applications that were available at launch included:

- Cortana, Microsoft's virtual assistant.
- Holograms, a catalog of a variety of 3D objects that users can place and scale around them; ranging from tigers and cats to space shuttles and planets.
- HoloStudio, a full-scale 3D modeling application by Microsoft with 3D print compatibility.
- CAE VimedixAR is a commercial application of Microsoft HoloLens technology that enables immersive simulation-based training in ultrasound and anatomical education through augmented reality for increased patient safety and enhanced learning.
- An implementation of the Skype telecommunications application by Microsoft. Any user with Skype on their regular devices like PC, Mobile etc. can dial user on HoloLens and communicate with each other. With Video call On, the user on PC will see the view HoloLens user is seeing and HoloLens user will see view captured by PC / Mobile device user camera.
- HoloTour, an audiovisual three-dimensional virtual tourism application developer by Microsoft and Asobo Studio.
- Fragments, a high-tech crime thriller adventure game developed by Microsoft and Asobo Studio, in which the player engages in crime-solving.
- Young Conker, a platform game developed by Microsoft and Asobo Studio, featuring a young version of Conker the Squirrel.
- RoboRaid (previously code-named "Project X-Ray"), an augmented-reality first-person shooter game by Microsoft in which the player defends against a robot invasion, aiming the weapon via gaze and shooting via the Clicker button or an air tap.
- Actiongram, an application for staging and recording short video clips of simple mixed-reality presentations using pre-made 3D virtual assets, was released on March 30, 2016 in the United States and Canada.
- In November 2018, Microsoft announced that it was readying HoloLens for military use. The company won a $480 million contract with the U.S. government to bring AR headset technology into the weapons repertoire of American soldiers as 'IVAS', the Integrated Visual Augmentation System.
- In April 2018, novel cardiac surgery was performed at the Jagiellonian University Hospital in Krakow using HoloLens imaging. In April 2021, an augmented reality laboratory was opened at the Jagiellonian University Medical College with the goal of implementing the HoloLens 2 in the medical imaginary education.

Other applications announced or showcased for HoloLens include:

- An interactive digital human anatomy and neuroanatomy curriculum by Case Western Reserve University and Cleveland Clinic.
- Architectural engineering software design tools, SketchUp Viewer by Trimble was the first commercially available HoloLens application.
- A version of the Mojang video game Minecraft.
- Extended functionality for the Autodesk Maya 3D creation application.
- OnSight and Sidekick, software projects developed by a collaboration between NASA and Microsoft to explore mixed reality applications in space exploration Developed in collaboration with JPL, OnSight integrates data from the Curiosity rover into a 3D simulation of the Martian environment, which scientists around the world can visualize, interact with and collaborate in together using HoloLens devices. OnSight can be used in mission planning, with users able to program rover activities by looking at a target within the simulation and using gestures to pull up and select menu commands. JPL plans to deploy OnSight in Curiosity mission operations, using it to control rover activities by July 2015.
- FreeForm, a joint project between Autodesk and Microsoft integrating HoloLens with the Autodesk Fusion cloud-based 3D development application.
- Galaxy Explorer, an educational application about the Milky Way in development by Microsoft Studios, pitched and chosen by the developer community via the Share Your Idea campaign and to be open-sourced upon completion.
- A spacecraft design/visualization application in development by NASA's Jet Propulsion Laboratory (JPL).
- In November 2015, Volvo and Microsoft exhibited a prototype version of the HoloLens system at Microsoft's HQ in Redmond using the S90 luxury sedan as their subject.
- CAE VimedixAR, the first ultrasound training simulator integrated with HoloLens that allows healthcare learners to interact with 3D holograms of internal human structures and acquire proficiency in anatomy.
- Holoportation, a new type of 3D capture technology that allows high-quality 3D models of people to be reconstructed, compressed and transmitted anywhere in the world in real time. When combined with mixed reality displays such as Hololens, this technology allows user to see and hear remote participants in 3D as if they are actually present in the same physical space.
- HoloSurg, in April 2017, a team of surgeons in Spain, used the mixed reality tool to operate on a patient with a malignant muscular tumor, using the headset to visualize MRI and radiography information during the surgery.
- Microsoft Dynamics 365 Remote Assist; can be combined with Microsoft Teams to send a secure live video feed to a computer screen in a nearby room.
- University education for medical and science students within disciplines that benefit from 3D representations of models, such as physiology, anatomy and pathology.
- Dawn Chorus by artist Sarah Meyohas. A mixed reality experience combining digitally rendered birds and algorithmic musical arrangement, Dawn Chorus merges HoloLens technologies with the Yamaha Disklavier piano.

== Interface ==
The HoloLens uses voice commands, gaze, hand gestures and a controller as the primary input methods. Gaze commands, such as head-tracking, allow the user to bring application focus to whatever the user is perceiving. "Elements"—or any virtual application or button—are selected using an air tap method, similar to clicking an imaginary computer mouse. The tap can be held for a drag simulation to move an element, as well as voice commands for certain commands and actions.

The HoloLens shell carries over and adapts many elements from the Windows desktop environment. A "bloom" gesture for accessing the shell (performing a similar function to pressing a Windows key on a Windows keyboard, tablet or the Xbox button on an Xbox One Controller) is performed by opening one's hand, fingers spread with the palm facing up. Windows can be dragged to a particular position, as well as resized. Virtual elements such as windows or menus can be "pinned" to locations, physical structures or objects within the environment; or can be "carried" or fixed in relation to the user, following the user as they move around. Title bars for application windows have a title on the left and buttons for window management functions on the right.

In April 2016 Microsoft created the Microsoft HoloLens App for Windows 10 PCs and Windows 10 Mobile devices. The app allows developers to run apps on the HoloLens, use cell phone or computer keyboards for text input, view streamed video from the HoloLens on an external device and remotely capture mixed reality photos and videos.

== Developing applications for HoloLens ==
Microsoft Visual Studio is an IDE that can be used to develop applications (both 2D and 3D) for HoloLens. Applications can be tested using HoloLens emulator (included into Visual Studio 2015 IDE) or HoloLens Development Edition.

=== 2D applications ===
HoloLens can run almost all Universal Windows Platform apps. These apps appear as 2D floating windows. Not all Windows 10 APIs are currently supported by HoloLens, but in most cases the same app is able to run across all Windows 10 devices (including HoloLens), and the same tools that are used to develop applications for Windows PCs or Windows Phone can be used to develop a HoloLens app.

=== 3D applications ===
3D applications use Windows Holographic APIs. Microsoft recommends Unity engine and Vuforia to create 3D apps for HoloLens, but it's also possible for a developer to build their own engine using DirectX and Windows APIs.

== Reception ==
In November 2018 Microsoft was awarded a contract for the supply of 100,000 HoloLens MR glasses, worth $479 million, to the U.S. military. The MR goggles are intended to provide "increased lethality, mobility and situational awareness necessary to achieve overmatch against [...] current and future adversaries." Just before the opening of one of the largest international technology conferences—the GSMA Mobile World Congress 2019 in Barcelona—fifty Microsoft employees wrote a letter to their CEO Satya Nadella and President Brad Smith stating that they "refuse to develop technologies for warfare and oppression." They demanded that corporate management terminate the contract.

Microsoft has decided to rent the Hololens without clients making the full investment. Microsoft partners with a company called Absorbents to give the service of HoloLens rental.

== See also ==
- Augmented reality
- Smartglasses
- Virtual reality
