= Microsoft Holoportation =

Project by Microsoft Research

Microsoft Holoportation is a project from Microsoft Research that demonstrates real-time holographic communications with the Microsoft Hololens. Holoportation is described as "a new type of 3D capture technology that allows high-quality 3D models of people to be reconstructed, compressed and transmitted anywhere in the world in real time. This allows users wearing virtual or augmented reality displays to see, hear and interact with remote participants in 3D, almost as if they were present in the same physical space. From an audio-visual perspective, communicating and interacting with remote users edges closer to face-to-face communication." The project was launched by Shahram Izadi and his Microsoft team in 2016. In March 2016, Alex Kipman performed a live demonstration of the technology at the TED conference as part of his talk. In 2020, Microsoft Mesh was launched which offered Holoportation capabilities to "project yourself as your most lifelike, photorealistic self in mixed reality to interact as if you are there in person".

== See also ==
- Augmented reality
- Virtual reality
- Telepresence
