= HoloLens 2 =

2019 mixed reality smartglasses

Microsoft HoloLens 2
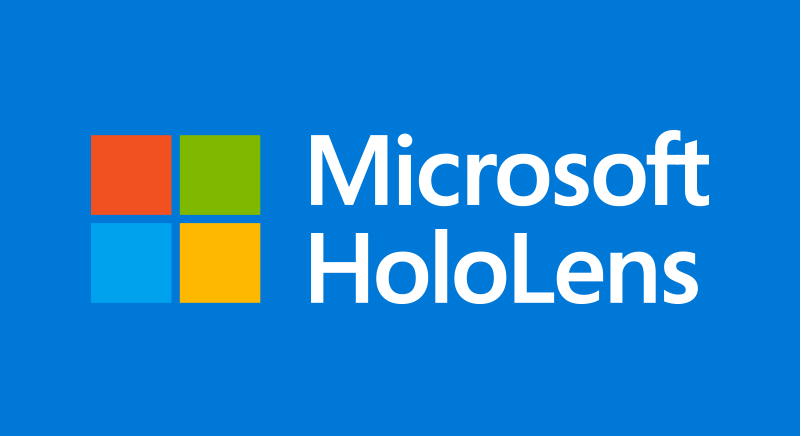
- Developer: Microsoft
- Manufacturer: Microsoft
- Product family: Windows 10
- Type: Mixed reality augmented reality head-mounted display smartglasses
- Generation: 2
- Released: November 7, 2019; 7 years ago
- Availability: Enterprise and developers
- Introductory price: $3500 USD, $125 USD per month Enterprise, $99 USD per month Developer
- Operating system: Windows 10 Holographic
- System on a chip: Qualcomm Snapdragon 850 Compute Platform
- CPU: Qualcomm Snapdragon 850
- Display: See-through holographic lenses 2K 3:2, 1440x936
- Graphics: Adreno 630
- Input: Eye tracking, spatial tracking, hand tracking.
- Camera: 8 MP 1080P30 video
- Connectivity: Bluetooth LE 5.0, 802.11 2x2 WiFi
- Platform: Universal Windows Platform
- Online services: Windows Holographic Operating System, Edge, Dynamics 365 Remote Assist, Dynamics 365 Layout, Dynamics 365 Guides, 3D Viewer, OneDrive for Business
- Weight: 566g
- Predecessor: HoloLens
- Website: www.microsoft.com/en-us/hololens/

Microsoft HoloLens 2 is an augmented reality (AR) and mixed reality head-mounted display developed and manufactured by Microsoft. It is the successor to the original Microsoft HoloLens. Microsoft announced HoloLens 2 on February 24, 2019. This was followed by a developer edition that was announced on May 2, 2019. The HoloLens 2 was subsequently released to limited numbers on November 7, 2019. The HoloLens 2 was discontinued with software updates continuing until December 31, 2027.

== Description ==
The HoloLens 2 was announced by lead HoloLens developer Alex Kipman on February 24, 2019 at Mobile World Congress (MWC) in Barcelona, Spain. On May 7, 2019 the HoloLens 2 was shown again at the Microsoft Build developer conference. There, it showcased an application created with the Unreal Game Engine.

The HoloLens 2 are combination waveguide and laser-based stereoscopic and full-color mixed reality smartglasses developed and manufactured by Microsoft. The US military's Integrated Visual Augmentation System is a further development of Hololens 2.

The HoloLens 2 is an early AR device. The displays on the HoloLens 2 are simple waveguide displays with a fixed focus of approximately two meters. Because of the fixed focus, the displays exhibit the Vergence-Accommodation Conflict, which is an unpleasant visual sensation for the viewer.

On August 20, 2019, at the Hot Chips 31 symposium Microsoft presented their Holographic Processing Unit (HPU) 2.0 custom design for the HoloLens 2 with the following features:

- 7x SIMD Fixed Point (SFP) for 2D processing
- 6x Floating Vector Processor (FVP) for 3D processing
- >1 tera-OP/s (TOPS) of programmable compute
- 125 Mb SRAM
- 79 mm^{2} die size and 2 billion transistors
- TSMC 16FF+ process
- PCIe 2.0 x1 at 100 MB/s bandwidth to Snapdragon 850

On August 29, 2019, at the World Artificial Intelligence Conference in Shanghai, Microsoft's Executive Vice President, Harry Shum, revealed that HoloLens 2 would go on sale in September 2019. The product started shipping on November 7, 2019.

== Improvements over the previous model ==
Microsoft highlighted three main improvements made to the device: immersiveness, ergonomics and business friendliness.

HoloLens 2 has a diagonal field of view of 52 degrees, improving over the 34 degree field of view (FOV) of the first edition of HoloLens, although Karl Guttag states that it offers less than 20 pixels per degree of resolution (despite Microsoft's claim that it would keep a resolution of 47 pixels per degree).

Holographic Processing Unit (HPU) 2.0 improvements compared to the HPU 1.0:

- 1.7x compute
- 2x effective DRAM bandwidth
- Improved hologram stability
- New hardware accelerated workloads such as eye tracking, fully articulated hand tracking, semantic labeling, spatial audio and JBL filter

== HoloLens 2 Emulator ==
The HoloLens 2 Emulator was made available to developers on April 17, 2019. This emulator allowed developers to create applications for the HoloLens 2 before the device was released to the public. The emulator continued to be updated after the device launched, and as of July 2025, the emulator was last updated in October 2024.

== Integrated Visual Augmentation System ==
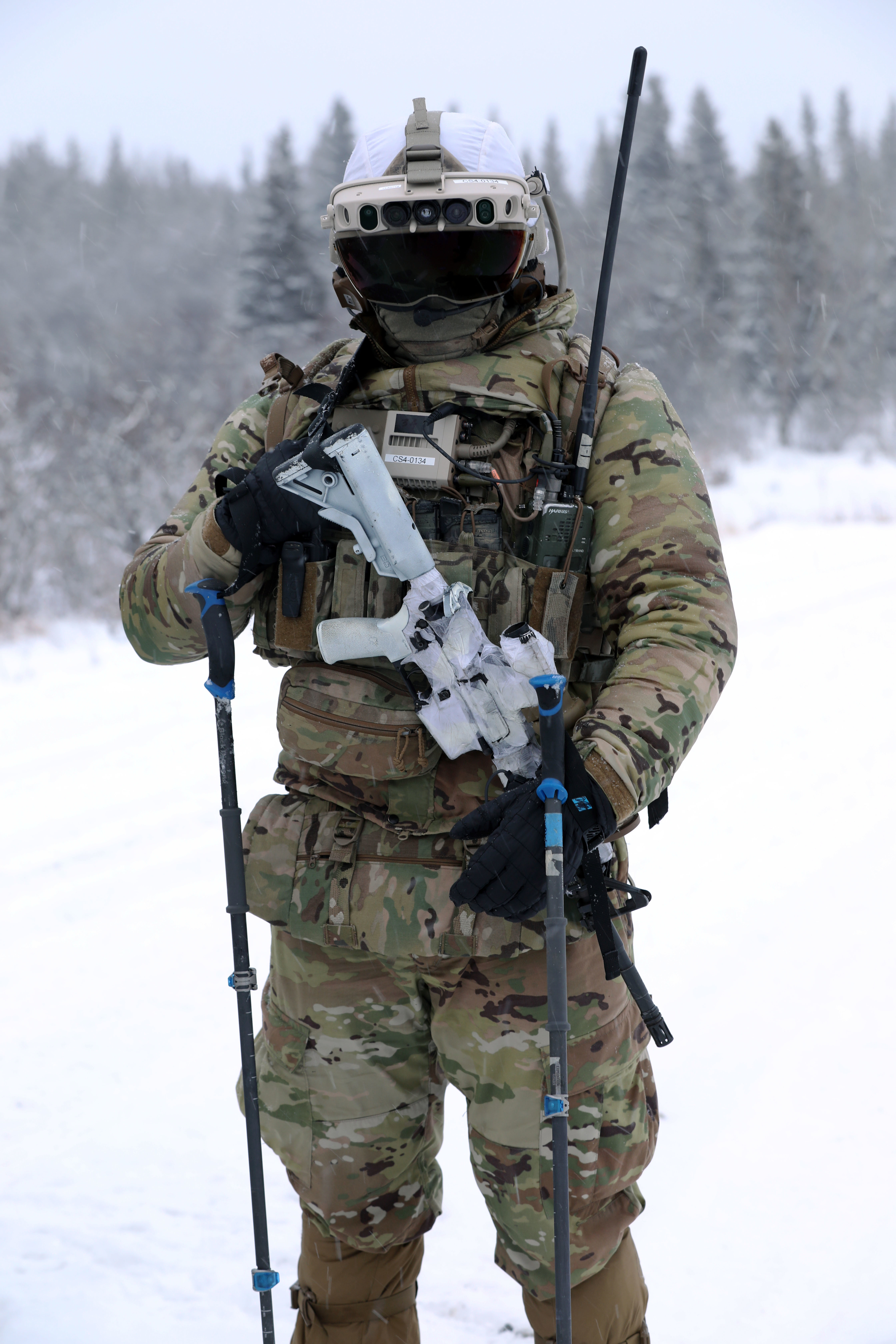
A US soldier testing the IVAS

The HoloLens 2 provided the basis for the United States Army's' Integrated Visual Augmentation System (IVAS) augmented reality headset.

In February 2019, after the contract for developing IVAS was signed between Microsoft and the US Army, more than 50 employees signed a petition calling for Microsoft to cancel the contract, saying that they "didn't want to become war profiteers". The petition stated that Microsoft had misled its engineers on how their products would be used; rather than being beneficial for civilians, they believed that the HoloLens is now being used to "help people kill". Satya Nadella, CEO of Microsoft, defended the contract, saying that the company is "not going to withhold technology from institutions that we have elected in democracies to protect the freedoms we enjoy". The US Army was also developing the technology to be used by dogs.

== Discontinuation ==
At release, HoloLens 2 was poorly received and garnered low sales numbers; it was stated to have a minimal impact to Microsoft as a business. During 2021, the augmented reality team at Microsoft lost approximately 100 employees due to strong competition, most notably Meta Platforms.

In 2024, Microsoft officially confirmed that production HoloLens 2 had officially halted, with software update support fully ending in 2028. The US Army continued to invest in the IVAS headset despite this, handing off the project to Anduril Industries and the Department of Defense.
