= PrimeSense =

Former Israeli company

- Type: Subsidiary of Apple
- Industry: Fabless semiconductor
- Founded: 2005
- Defunct: 2013
- Fate: Acquired by Apple
- Headquarters: Tel Aviv, Israel
- Key people: Aviad Maizels (president and founder); Alexander Shpunt (chief technology officer and cofounder); Inon Beracha (CEO)
- Products: PrimeSense 3D sensor; Carmine 1.08; Carmine 1.09 (short range); Capri 1.25 (not yet available); Carmine 1080 SoC; Capri 1200 SoC (not yet available); NiTE middleware
- Parent: Apple
- Website: primesense.com at the Wayback Machine (archived 2012-09-22)

PrimeSense was an Israeli 3D sensing company based in Tel Aviv. PrimeSense had offices in Israel, North America, Japan, Singapore, Korea, China and Taiwan. PrimeSense was bought by Apple for $360 million on November 24, 2013.

== History ==
PrimeSense was a fabless semiconductor company and provided products in the area of sensory inputs for consumer and commercial markets.

PrimeSense's technology had been originally applied to gaming but was later applied in other fields. PrimeSense was best known for licensing the hardware design and chip used in Microsoft's Kinect motion-sensing system for the Xbox 360 in 2010. The company had been founded in 2005 to explore depth-sensing cameras which they had demonstrated to developers at the 2006 Game Developers Conference. Microsoft had been looking on its own at 3D camera technology applications to its Xbox line of consoles, and engaged with PrimeSense after the conference to help establish the direction the technology needed to go to make it into consumer-grade products, while Microsoft improved on additional software aspects and incorporated machine learning to help with motion detection.

On November 24, 2013, Apple confirmed the purchase of PrimeSense for $360 million.

== Technology ==
=== Light coding technology ===
PrimeSense's depth acquisition was enabled by "light coding" technology. The process coded the scene with near-IR light, light that returns distorted depending upon where things are (Structured light). The solution then used a standard off-the-shelf CMOS image sensor to read the coded light back from the scene using various algorithms to triangulate and extract the 3D data. The product analysed scenery in 3 dimensions with software, so that devices could interact with users.

=== Products ===
==== PrimeSense system on a chip (SoC) ====
The CMOS image sensor worked with the visible video sensor to enable the depth map provided by PrimeSense SoC's Carmine (PS1080) and Capri (PS1200) to be merged with the color image. The SoCs performed a registration process so the color image (RGB) and depth (D) information was aligned properly. The light coding infrared patterns were deciphered in order to produce a VGA size depth image of a scene. It delivered visible video, depth, and audio information in a synchronized fashion via the USB 2.0 interface. The SoC had minimal CPU requirements as all depth acquisition algorithms ran on the SoC itself.

==== PrimeSense sensors ====
- Carmine 1.08
- Carmine 1.09 (short range)
- Capri 1.25 (embedded)

PrimeSense embedded its technology in its own sensors, the Carmine 1.08 and Carmine 1.09. Capri 1.25, touted by the company as the world's smallest 3D sensor, debuted at International CES 2013.

==== PrimeSense middleware ====
PrimeSense developed NiTE middleware which analyzed the data from hardware and modules for OpenNI providing gesture and skeleton tracking. They were released only as binaries. According to the NiTE LinkedIn page: "Including computer vision algorithims, NiTE identifies users and tracks their movements, and provides the framework API for implementing natural-interaction UI controls based on gestures." The system could then interpret specific gestures, making completely hands-free control of electronic devices a reality. Including:

- Identification of people their body properties, movements and gestures
- Classification of objects such as furniture
- Location of walls and floor

== Markets ==
PrimeSense's original focus was on the gaming and living room markets, but expanded to include:

=== Television ===
- Kinect by Microsoft was powered by PrimeSense technology that allowed gamers to use their entire body to control play, action and movement of their onscreen characters.

=== PC and mobile ===
- WAVI Xtion for the PC by ASUS used PrimeSense's core 3D sensing solution, developed primarily for browsing multimedia content, accessing Web sites and social networks when the PC was hooked up to the living room TV.
- [Structure Sensor] Mobile 3D sensor by Occipital used a custom chip based on PrimeSense's 3D sensing solution. The sensor itself was designed to easily attach to a wide range of devices, including the Apple iPad, Android tablets and desktop platforms such as Windows, OS X and Linux.

=== Interactive displays ===
- Firecube SMART by Firecube Public Multimedia: An interactive multimedia solution for games, presentations and attractions in public spaces.
- EyePlay by Eyeclick - an interactive video gaming system with 3D interactive projection capabilities.
- ViiMotion by Covii:an Interactive Software Device, created to provide generic or custom interactive applications through computer vision.
- Interactive Projector by Ayotle: an interactive solution that used a depth sensor to make any real or imaginary surface act like a tactile or contactless interactive device.
- Finger Tracking MW by 3Gear Systems: a precise tracking system that used computer graphics algorithms for reconstructing the precise pose of the user's hands from 3D cameras

=== Retail ===
- SmartFit by Styku:a multi-channel retail platform for fit prediction and visualization
- Bodymetrics pod by Bodymetrics: a full 3D body scanner that was designed to calculate measurements which are then analyzed and used to find suitable garments.
- Matterport Pro 3D Camera by Matterport: a consumer 3D camera that creates immersive panoramic tours with an underlying 3D mesh.

=== Robotics ===
- SAMI by Criif: PrimeSense sensors allow the humanoid robot to be fully autonomous in the house or specific environment.

=== Healthcare ===
- Ava by iRobot: an autonomous mobile robotics platform

== Timeline ==
- 2005
  - PrimeSense is founded
- 2010
  - Microsoft names PrimeSense as Project Natal partner
- 2011
  - PrimeSense raises a round of private equity funding as part of its plan to expand its motion-control chips
  - PrimeSense is selected by MIT Technology Review for World's Ten Most Important Technologies
- 2012
  - PrimeSense is selected as a World Economic Forum Technology Pioneer
  - Announces the launch of its next generation embedded 3D sensor, Capri 1.25

== Partners ==
- Occipital
- Covii
- DotProduct
- Matterport
- 3Gear Systems
- Ayotle
- Willow Garage
- Open Perception
- Shopperception
- SideKick
- MediaStanza
- ASUS, the only remaining source of sensors based on PrimeSense technology

PrimeSense was a founding member of OpenNI, an industry-led, non-profit organization formed to certify and promote the compatibility and interoperability of Natural Interaction (NI) devices, applications and middleware. The original OpenNI project was shut down by Apple when it bought the open source software, but Occipital kept a forked version of OpenNI 2 active as an open source software for the SDK for its Structure Product.

The company provided the 3D sensing technology for the first Kinect, previously known as Project Natal.

== Awards ==
The company was selected by MIT Technology Review magazine as one of world's 50 most innovative companies for 2011.

PrimeSense won Design Team of the Year in EE Times 2011 Annual Creativity in Electronics (ACE)

PrimeSense was honored as a World Economic Forum Technology Pioneer in 2013.
