= Ayotle =

French-Mexican software company

- Company type: Private Company
- Industry: Computer Vision Software
- Founded: 2010
- Headquarters: France
- Key people: Gisèle Belliot, CEO; José Alonso Ybanez Zepeda

Ayotle is a French-Mexican company headquartered in Paris, France, that develops computer vision software. It provides technical services based on motion capture and 3D sensors for interactive applications in the media and entertainment industries. The company was co-founded by José Alonso Ybanez Zepeda and Gisèle Belliot in June 2010.

Ayotle is mainly focused on the development and implementation of advanced algorithms for computer vision, from video images in all formats to the use of 3D cameras or depth sensors.

== Etymology ==
The name Ayotle comes from the word ayotl, which means turtle shell in Nahuatl, the original language used by the Aztecs in Mexico.

== Support ==
Ayotle is currently supported by Paris Region Lab, ASTIA, Mairie de Paris, Oséo, Scientipôle Initiative, Cap-Digital, Telecom ParisTech
