= Integrated Visual Augmentation System =

US Army augmented reality headset

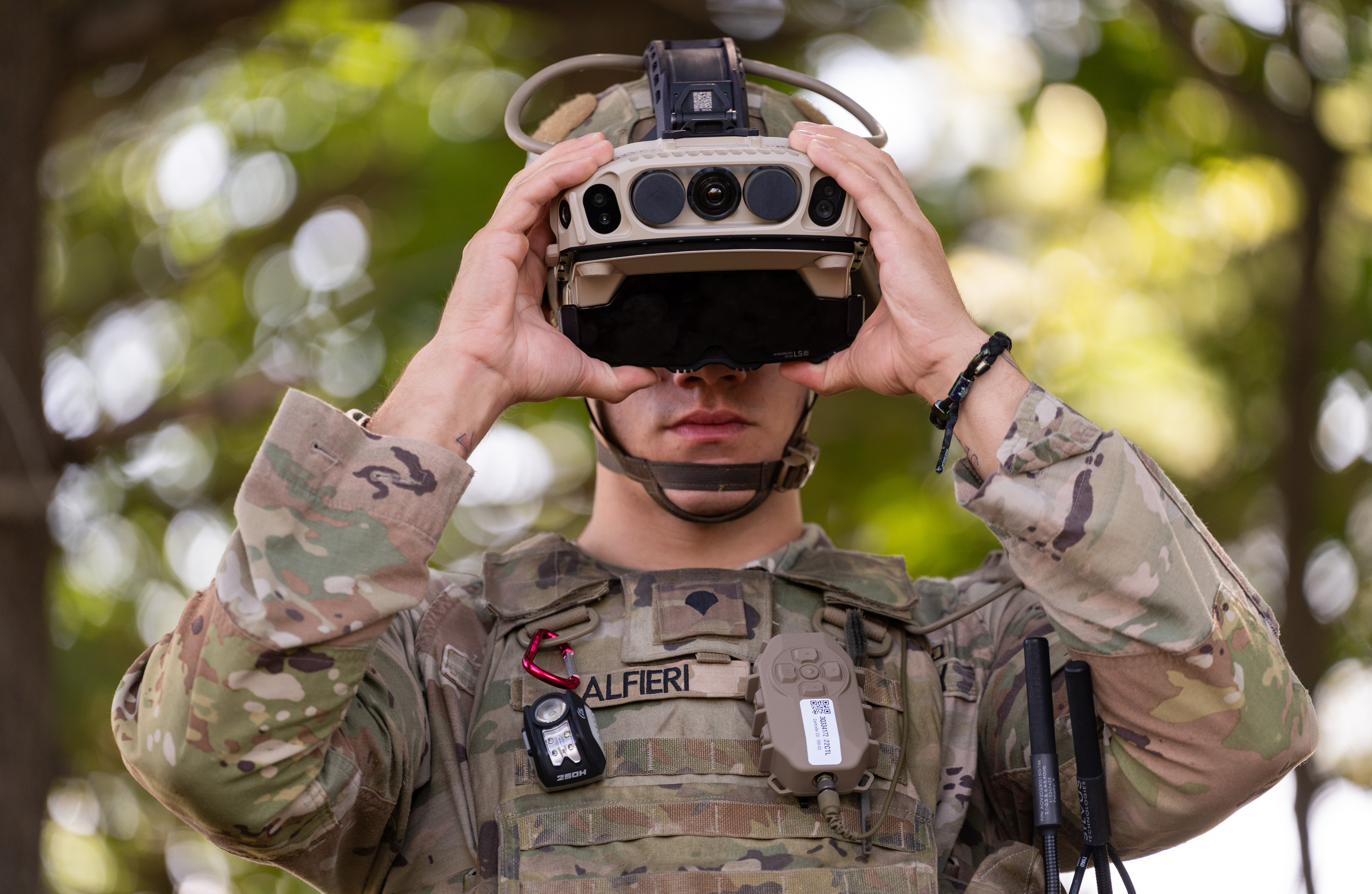
- Soldier dons IVAS 1.2 Prototype during user assessment.
- Type: Augmented reality headset
- Place of origin: United States

Production history
- Designer: Microsoft; Anduril Industries
- Designed: 2018 (8 years ago)

Specifications
- Weight: 3.4 lb (1.5 kg)

The Integrated Visual Augmentation System (IVAS) is an augmented reality headset that was being developed by Anduril Industries and (formerly) Microsoft for the United States Army. It was intended to improve situational awareness by overlaying sensor imagery and other information on the soldier's field of view. Originally developed for infantry, it was also being adapted for use by mounted soldiers and aircrew.

Its development began in 2018. Initially intended to be fielded in 2021, ergonomic and reliability issues pushed this date back to 2025. Soldiers and offices of the United States Department of Defense and United States Congress repeatedly criticized the device and its development process for issues with technology and project management.

Initially, Microsoft was the sole developer, but in February 2025, Anduril announced that they were talking over the entire project, whilst keeping Microsoft as the exclusive cloud provider . Anduril Industries was to "assume oversight of production, future development of hardware and software, and delivery timelines".

In the March 2026 published, 2025 Annual Report of the Office of the Director, Operation Test and Evaluation, the Army stated that it would not "test, produce, or field any IVAS variant systems in the future." In April 2025, the next generation of IVAS was rebranded as Soldier Borne Mission Command (SBMC).

== Design ==
IVAS is an augmented reality system based on the Microsoft HoloLens 2 headset. It intends to provide soldiers with "improved situational awareness, target engagement, and informed decision-making".

The system consists of a display, a computer known as a "puck", a networked data radio, and three conformal batteries. The display can augment the soldier's vision with imagery from thermal imaging and low-light imaging sensors. The radio allows data from the soldiers' individual IVAS headsets to be passed among members of the company.

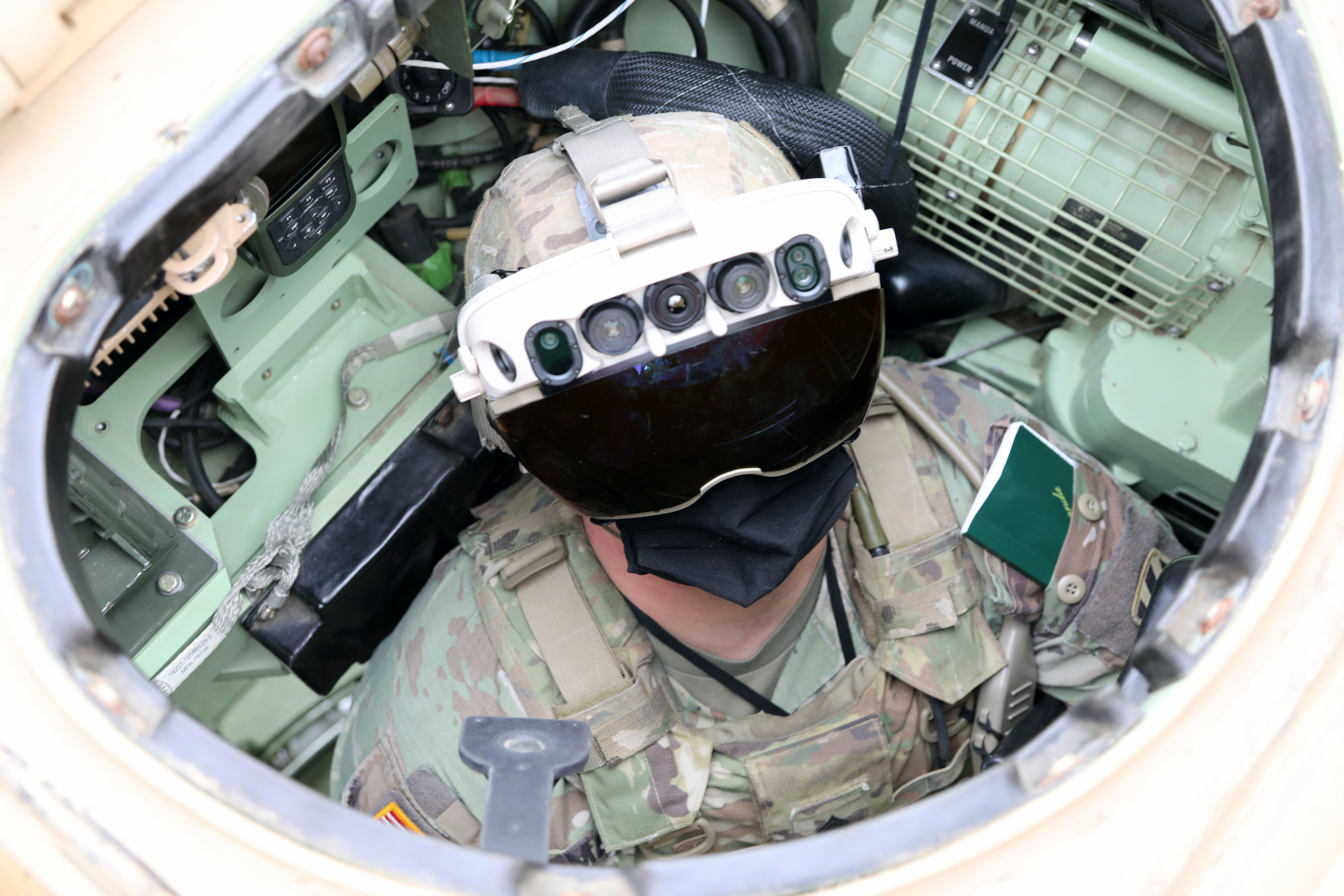
Mounted soldier wearing IVAS

The latest version of IVAS, version 1.2, weighs 3.4 pounds (1.5 kg), although developers are working to reduce this to the target weight of 2.9 pounds (1.3 kg). The computer is attached to the back of the helmet to distribute weight and move the center of mass. The display has a field of view of 60 degrees, using a flat display that can be flipped upwards.

Software installed in the computer allows IVAS to perform many functions. Version 1.2 introduced an embedded training tool known as the "Squad Immersive Virtual Trainer", a piece of software that can project holographic and mixed reality imagery via the IVAS headset to help train soldiers in combat. Navigation applications can display maps of terrain and interiors of buildings, and show the positions of friendly and enemy forces. New kinds of software can also be developed and uploaded to expand IVAS's capabilities; examples include designating fields of fire for machine gunners, generating medivac reports, and conducting field surgery assisted by augmented reality.

In March 2021, the U.S. Army announced that IVAS was being tested with mounted soldiers, such as on Bradley Fighting Vehicle and Stryker teams. By June 2021, the US Army announced it was expanding IVAS tests to include aircrews for helicopters and drones. In comparison to the US$400,000 purely-slaved and aircraft-dependent F-35 helmet that must be custom-built for each pilot, IVAS attached to any helmet, was estimated to cost US$29,205 per unit, and could optionally work independently of the aircraft when the crew dismounts.

== Development ==
The idea of using AR to provide situational awareness for soldiers was first developed in the Battlefield Augmented Reality System (BARS), developed at the United States Naval Research Laboratory between 1998 and 2005. The Army Acquisition Executive first approved IVAS's development effort on 25 September 2018, and an Other Transaction Agreement for the development of IVAS was issued to Microsoft in November 2018. Initial testing began in March 2019.

In October 2024 Microsoft announced it was discontinuing the HoloLens 2, while also stating ".. we remain fully committed to the IVAS program ..."

From February 2025 Anduril Industries was to partner with Microsoft in developing IVAS.

=== Early versions ===
Early models of IVAS were very similar to civilian HoloLens 2 headsets, which were not resistant to inclement weather and could not even function in rain. IVAS entered its third iteration in October 2020, the first version to be ruggedized for military use. The system was tested in late October 2020 at Fort Pickett by some Marines and members of the 82nd Airborne Division. The test was to get soldier feedback and refine the system for eventual battlefield use.

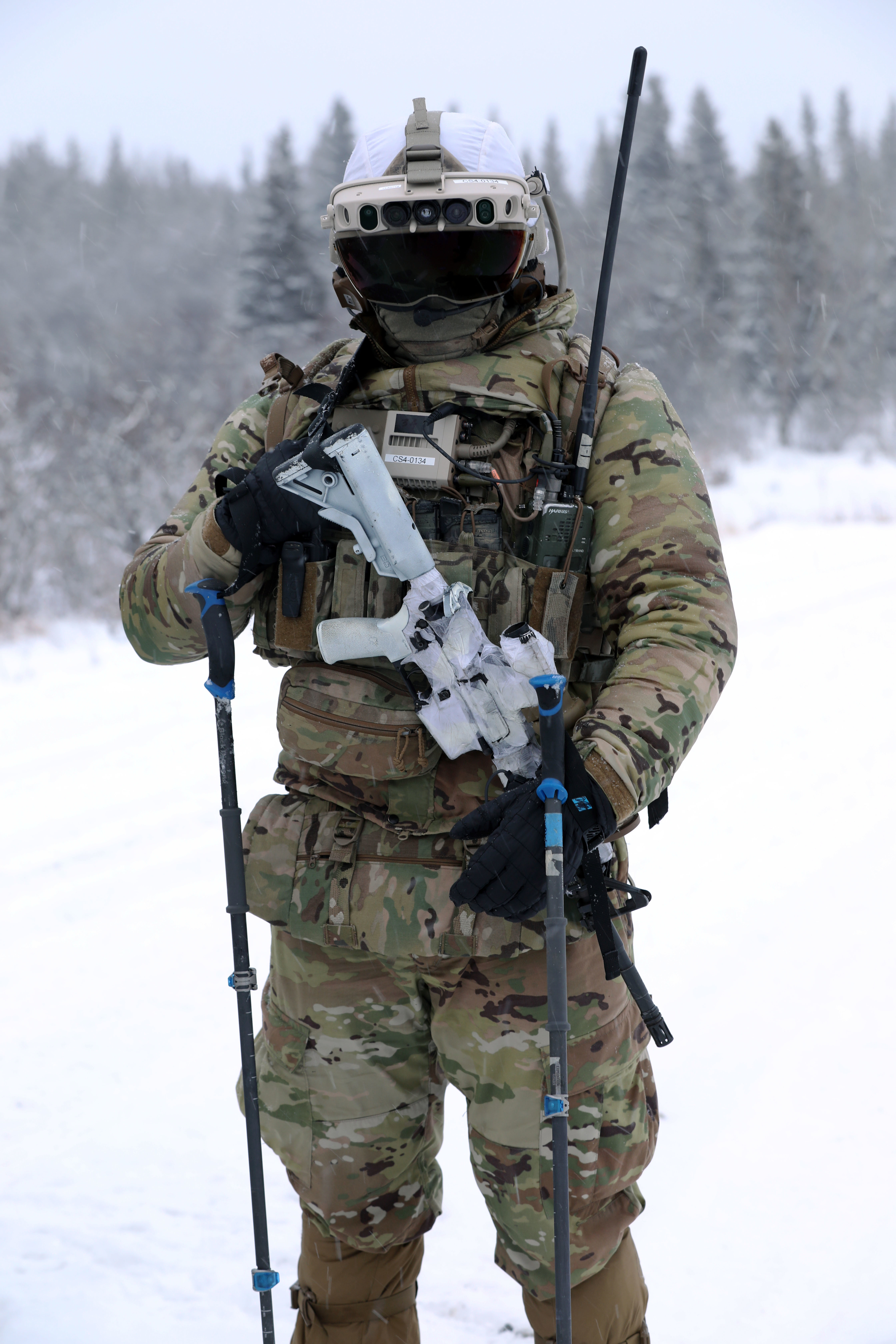
IVAS Capability Set 4 during testing at Fort Greely, Alaska

After nearly 2 years in development, the final IVAS Capability Set 4 system was scheduled to be fielded in 2021. Over 40,000 sets were planned to be issued. On 26 March 2021, Microsoft was awarded a "fixed price production agreement" by the United States Army to manufacture and supply IVAS headsets. Microsoft would produce headsets for at least 120,000 members of the Army Close Combat Force. The contract was worth up to US$21.88 billion. In September 2021, an "Adversarial Electronic Warfare and Cybersecurity Test" of IVAS was conducted. In mid-October, the system's "Operational Test and fielding" was moved to 2022. David Patterson, PEO Soldier Director of Public Affairs, said: "The Army intends to continue developing and fielding this revolutionary, first-of-its-kind technology in FY22."

Initial operational testing of IVAS began in May 2022 and concluded in late June, although at the time it was believed that the fielding of IVAS in September was unlikely. Nevertheless, in September 2022, the US Army began accepting 5,000 units of the IVAS and was planning to field them, even though these units were still early versions of the IVAS and would require future software upgrades. However, in November 2022, the US Army announced a "course correction" to the program, due to soldiers reporting physical ailments after using IVAS in the field. The main symptoms were headaches, eye strain, and nausea. A report by the Department of Defense Office of Inspector General raised concerns that these problems may lead to soldiers not using the system even if it was issued to them. The US Army and Microsoft decided to renegotiate their contract and redesign the form factor while still planning to field 10,000 initial units.

=== IVAS 1.2 ===
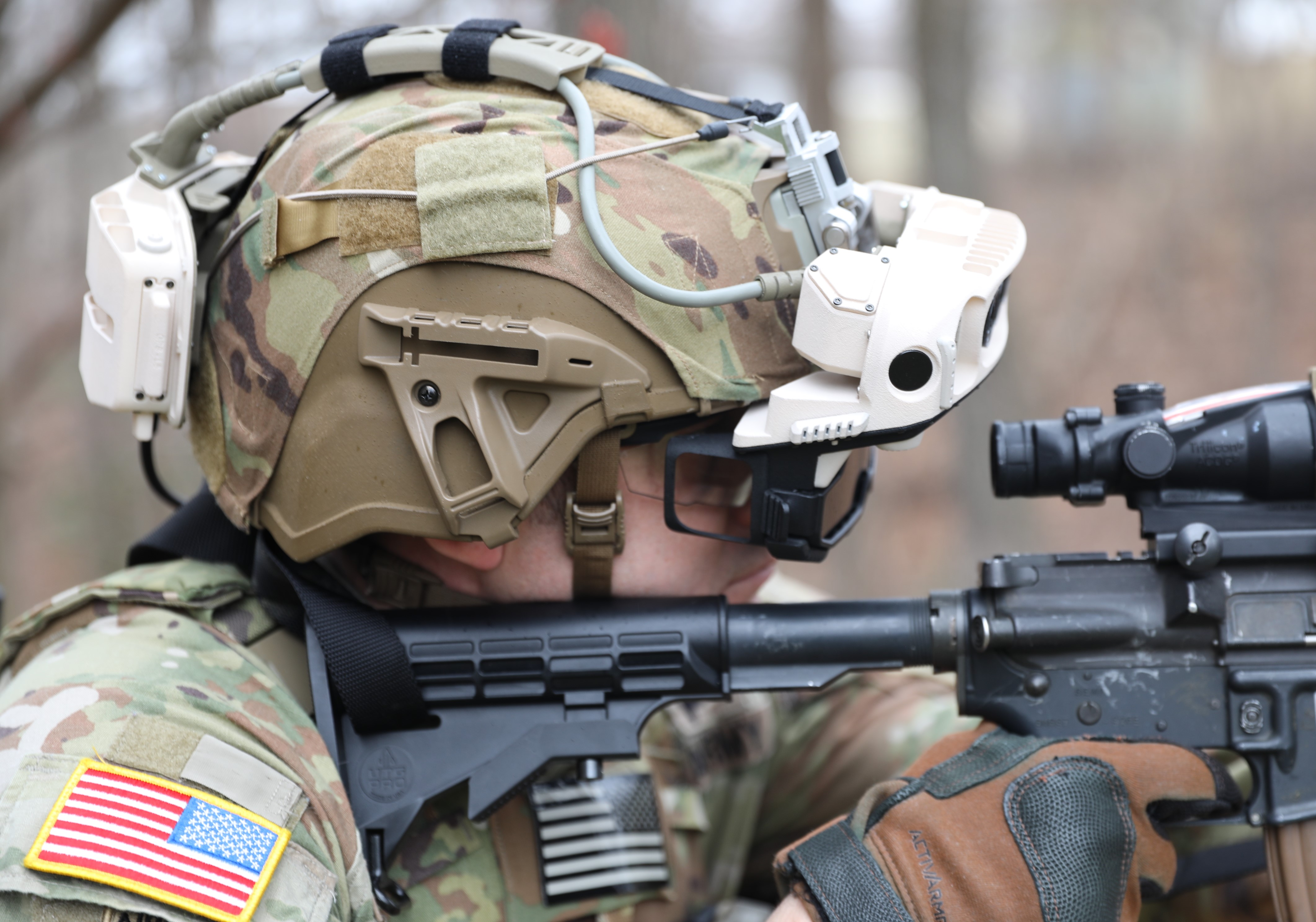
Version 1.2 with flat display and computer on the rear of the helmet

In March 2023, following the "course correction" to the program with Microsoft, the US Army exhibited IVAS version 1.2. Although the new variant was still based on the civilian HoloLens headset, there had been some changes from previous versions, such as the separation of the controller from the computer, with the controller now able to be attached to any part of the upper torso and the computer being mounted on the rear of the helmet. The previous helmet-like display was replaced by a flat display with better clarity, better line-of-sight, and also a hinge that allows the display to be flipped up. As a result, the field of view was reduced from 70 degrees to 60 degrees. The thermal camera was also being improved to increase clarity while reducing power consumption.

Problems still existed in the new version. The newly added "Squad Immersive Virtual Trainer" encountered an issue known as "dynamic occlusion limitations", which was the inability of augmented reality devices to simulate how the user's view of virtual objects was blocked by real objects. Experts in the field had yet to find a general solution to the issue, although the US Army stated that it would work to fix it.

Testing of IVAS 1.2 began in August 2023 after 20 prototypes were delivered to the US Army. Microsoft was awarded another US$95 million for the next stage of the program, which included the delivery of 280 pre-production and "production representative" IVAS 1.2 systems for testing in Fiscal Year 2024, aiming to field an improved version of IVAS in Fiscal Year 2025.

The IVAS 1.2 variant operational assessment (OA) scheduled for April 2025 was cancelled by the army.

=== IVAS-Next ===
In December 2023 the Army hosted its first "Industry Day" for the IVAS 1.2 follow-on effort, then called 'IVAS-Next'.

In March 2025, the Army announced that IVAS-Next was to be renamed to 'Soldier Borne Mission Command' (SBMC) and that the service "anticipates a full and open competition for SBMC." The Army awarded contracts of $159 million to Anduril and $195 million to start-up firm Rivet for SBMC, which they described as a "new effort to develop a fused digital awareness system optimized to emerging modular sensor technologies." The contracts are reported to "cover an 18-month rapid prototyping sprint."

=== End of development as IVAS ===
In the 2025 financial year Annual Report of the Office of the Director, Operation Test and Evaluation, the Army determined that it would not "test, produce, or field any IVAS variant systems in the future."

"In July 2026, the Government Accountability Office (GAO) noted that "the Army determined that none of [the 10,000] developed [IVAS] units will be fielded" and that IVAS 1.2 will now transition to a rapid prototyping effort, Soldier Borne Mission Command (SBMC). As Congress evaluates SBMC authorizations and appropriations, it may consider the program's history and technological maturity as well as its implications for military personnel, force structure, and cybersecurity."

== Reception ==
In February 2019, not long after the contract for developing IVAS was signed between Microsoft and the US Army, more than 50 employees signed a petition calling for Microsoft to cancel the contract, saying that they "didn't want to become war profiteers". The petition stated that Microsoft had misled its engineers on how their products would be used; rather than being beneficial for civilians, they believed that the Hololens is now being used to "help people kill". Satya Nadella, CEO of Microsoft, defended the contract, saying that the company is "not going to withhold technology from institutions that we have elected in democracies to protect the freedoms we enjoy".

The various issues in the system's development often caused concern in the United States Congress. In December 2020, Congress decided to cut US$230 million of the US$1.1 billion request for the Army's IVAS goggles. It also wanted the US Army to submit a report detailing the acquisition strategy for the IVAS program by 15 August 2021. In March 2022, considering the numerous technical issues the program encountered, Congress again withheld approximately US$400 million in funding for the program until IVAS completed its initial operation testing and the Program Executive Office Soldier briefed the appropriations committees on the program's progress.

Soldiers involved in testing IVAS also expressed their dissatisfaction with early versions of the system in 2022. One soldier commented that "the devices would have gotten us killed", referring to the glow emitted by the headset that can be seen from hundreds of meters away. They were also concerned about the limited peripheral vision and the bulkiness of the system that restricted their movement. In an "unusually stinging" audit released on April 22 2022, the Department of Defense Inspector General stated that the US Army wasn't effectively measuring user satisfaction with IVAS and that it was "wasting money" if soldiers don't like the system. The Army contested the report's conclusions, describing them as "fundamentally flawed and inflammatory", although the Army partially agreed with recommendations to better measure acceptance of the system.

The Director, Operational Test and Evaluation report published in January 2023 criticized the performance of IVAS 1.0 in tests. It stated that most soldiers testing the IVAS headset reported a wide range of physical impairments and numerous technical deficiencies that negatively impacted their performance. It found that soldiers accomplished their missions better with their current equipment than with IVAS. Furthermore, there were no improvements and even declines in the system's reliability throughout its development.

Despite the numerous issues and criticisms, the US Army remained optimistic about the program. In 2023, Doug Bush, the Assistant Secretary of the Army for Acquisition, Logistics, and Technology, believed that the program is "on a good track", saying: "I think early returns are positive, which is a good thing to see." A news release from the US Army stated that despite the previous delays, IVAS will still be fielded "several years ahead of standard acquisition programs".

In March 2026, the 2025 financial year Annual Report of the Office of the Director, Operation Test and Evaluation, the Army determined that it would not "test, produce, or field any IVAS variant systems in the future."
