= Photomultiplier =

A photomultiplier is a device that converts incident photons into an electrical signal.

Kinds of photomultiplier include:

- Photomultiplier tube, a vacuum tube converting incident photons into an electric signal. Photomultiplier tubes (PMTs for short) are members of the class of vacuum tubes, and more specifically vacuum phototubes, which are extremely sensitive detectors of light in the ultraviolet, visible, and near-infrared ranges of the electromagnetic spectrum.
  - Magnetic photomultiplier, developed by the Soviets in the 1930s.
  - Electrostatic photomultiplier, a kind of photomultiplier tube demonstrated by Jan Rajchman of RCA Laboratories in Princeton, NJ in the late 1930s which became the standard for all future commercial photomultipliers. The first mass-produced photomultiplier, the Type 931, was of this design and is still commercially produced today.
- Silicon photomultiplier, a solid-state device converting incident photons into an electric signal. Silicon photomultipliers, often called "SiPM" in the literature, are solid-state single-photon-sensitive devices based on Single-photon avalanche diode (SPAD) implemented on common silicon substrate.
