= Markarian 478 =

Seyfert 1 galaxy in the constellation Boötes

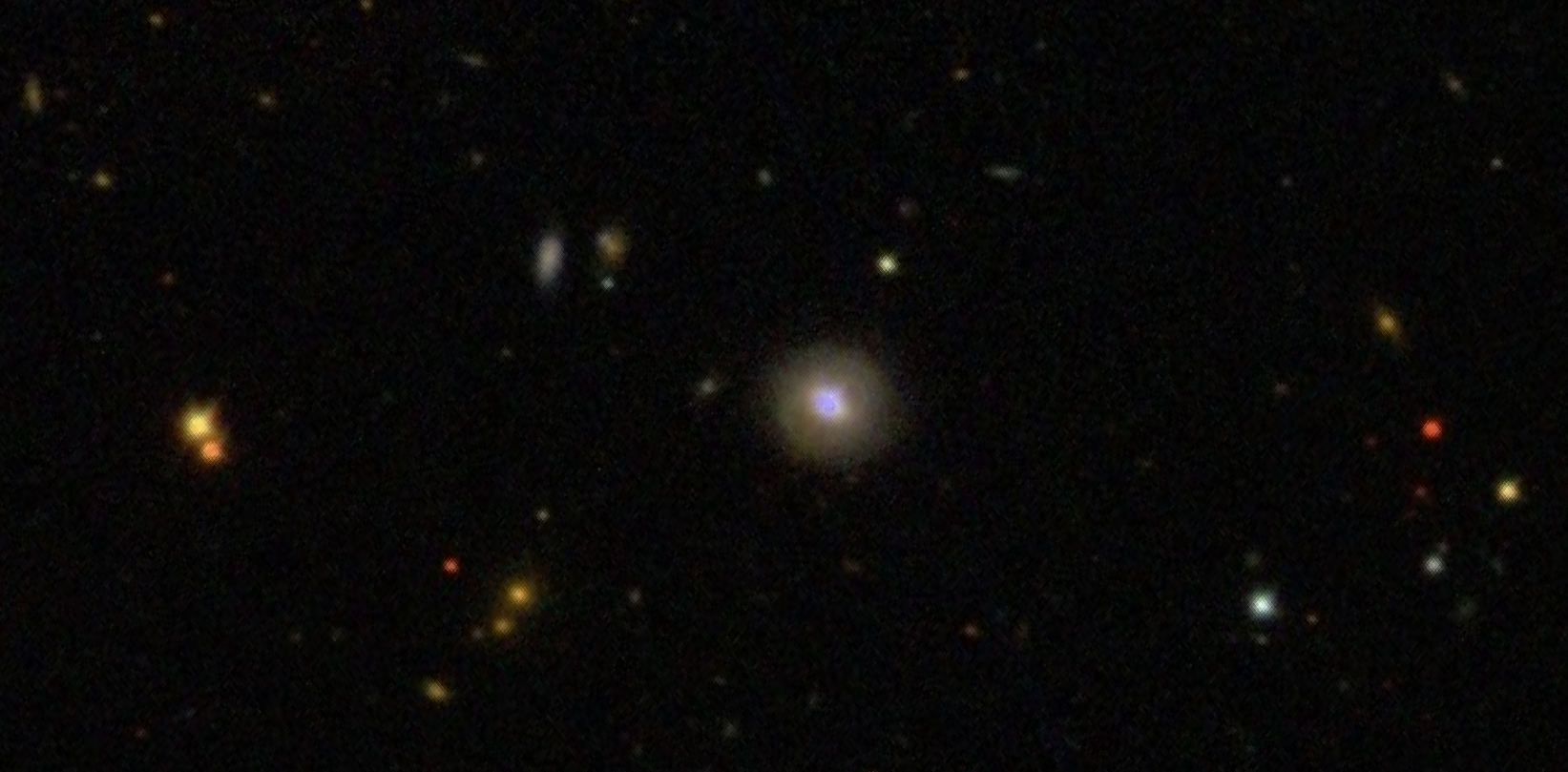
- SDSS image of Seyfert galaxy Markarian 478

Observation data (J2000.0 epoch)
- Constellation: Boötes
- Right ascension: 14^{h} 42^{m} 07.47^{s}
- Declination: +35° 26′ 22.95″
- Redshift: 0.079055
- Heliocentric radial velocity: 23,700 km/s
- Distance: 1.08 Gly
- Apparent magnitude (V): 14.58

Characteristics
- Type: Spiral Sy1
- Size: ~137,000 ly (42.1 kpc) (estimated)

Other designations
- PG 1440+356, IRAS 14400+3539, PGC 52510, CG 0512, RBS 1418, RX J1442.1+3526, NVSS J144207+352624

Markarian 478 also known as MRK 478, is a Seyfert 1 galaxy located in the constellation of Boötes. The redshift of the galaxy is (z) 0.079, giving it a distance of about 1 billion light-years from Earth. It was first discovered in 1974 by astronomers from Arecibo Observatory via a 1000-foot radio telescope. It displays doubly ionized iron emission lines in its spectrum and is classified as a radio-quiet quasar.

== Description ==
Markarian 478 is specifically described as a prototype narrow-line Seyfert galaxy. It displays emission lines that are increasing in flux levels in blue wing components with increasing line peaks in velocity shifts. The spectrum of this galaxy also shows the presence of absorption lines on the blue wing components of emission doublets and Lyman β lines. Observations also found the high-ionization emission lines have high velocities at blueshifts suggesting outflowing gas is mainly produced in its broad-line region.

The host of Markarian 478 is a round spiral galaxy with two undisturbed asymmetric and visible spiral arms. Its nucleus is elongated northeast to southeast, with its main body also being elongated perpendicular to it. Evidence also showed there are faint shells or arms in the host implying a clear disturbed morphology. A 3.3-ɥm PAH emission feature was detected in the galaxy.

Markarian 478 is variable. Based on its EUV (Extreme Ultraviolet Emission) light curve, most of the flux variations occurred in the lines and not in continuum. The amplitude variations are described as highly significant, occurring on a factor of three on a timescale less than one day.

The X-ray spectrum of Markarian 478 is soft and steep. It is also mainly dominated by soft excess with some traces of excess residuals in the 5-7 KeV band. Based on observation results using data from Swift, XMM-Newton and AstroSat, it is shown to have both long-term and intermediate-term variability. Evidence also showed the reflection fraction is anticorrelated, with the spectral index and flux suggesting the variability was caused by hard X-rays that were producing a corona moving closer and away from its central black hole. The mass of the black hole in Markarian 478 is estimated to be 7.30 M_{☉}.
