= Fluorescence-lifetime imaging microscopy =

Imaging technique based on fluorescence

Fluorescence-lifetime imaging microscopy or FLIM is an imaging technique based on the differences in the exponential decay rate of the photon emission of a fluorophore from a sample. It can be used as an imaging technique in confocal microscopy, two-photon excitation microscopy, and multiphoton tomography.

The fluorescence lifetime (FLT) of the fluorophore, rather than its intensity, is used to create the image in FLIM. Fluorescence lifetime depends on the local micro-environment of the fluorophore, thus precluding any erroneous measurements in fluorescence intensity due to change in brightness of the light source, background light intensity or limited photo-bleaching. This technique also has the advantage of minimizing the effect of photon scattering in thick layers of sample. Being dependent on the micro-environment, lifetime measurements have been used as an indicator for pH, viscosity and chemical species concentration.

== Fluorescence lifetimes ==
A fluorophore which is excited by a photon will drop to the ground state with a certain probability based on the decay rates through a number of different (radiative and/or nonradiative) decay pathways. To observe fluorescence, one of these pathways must be by spontaneous emission of a photon. In the ensemble description, the fluorescence emitted will decay with time according to

$$I(t) = I_0 e^{-t/\tau}$$

where

$$\frac{1}{\tau} = \sum k_i$$.

In the above, $t$ is time, $\tau$ is the fluorescence lifetime, $I_0$ is the initial fluorescence at $t=0$, and $k_i$ are the rates for each decay pathway, at least one of which must be the fluorescence decay rate $k_f$. More importantly, the lifetime, $\tau$ is independent of the initial intensity and of the emitted light. This can be utilized for making non-intensity based measurements in chemical sensing.

== Measurement ==
Fluorescence-lifetime imaging yields images with the intensity of each pixel determined by $\tau$, which allows one to view contrast between materials with different fluorescence decay rates (even if those materials fluoresce at exactly the same wavelength), and also produces images which show changes in other decay pathways, such as in FRET imaging.

=== Pulsed illumination ===
Fluorescence lifetimes can be determined in the time domain by using a pulsed source. When a population of fluorophores is excited by an ultrashort or delta pulse of light, the time-resolved fluorescence will decay exponentially as described above. However, if the excitation pulse or detection response is wide, the measured fluorescence, d(t), will not be purely exponential. The instrumental response function, IRF(t) will be convolved or blended with the decay function, F(t).

${d}(t) = {IRF}(t) \otimes {F}(t)$

The instrumental response of the source, detector, and electronics can be measured, usually from scattered excitation light. Recovering the decay function (and corresponding lifetimes) poses additional challenges as division in the frequency domain tends to produce high noise when the denominator is close to zero.

==== TCSPC ====
Time-correlated single-photon counting (TCSPC) is usually employed because it compensates for variations in source intensity and single photon pulse amplitudes. Using commercial TCSPC equipment a fluorescence decay curve can be recorded with a time resolution down to 405 fs. The recorded fluorescence decay histogram obeys Poisson statistics which is considered in determining goodness of fit during fitting. More specifically, TCSPC records times at which individual photons are detected by a fast single-photon detector (typically a photo-multiplier tube (PMT) or a single photon avalanche photo diode (SPAD)) with respect to the excitation laser pulse. The recordings are repeated for multiple laser pulses and after enough recorded events, one is able to build a histogram of the number of events across all of these recorded time points. This histogram can then be fit to an exponential function that contains the exponential lifetime decay function of interest, and the lifetime parameter can accordingly be extracted. Multi-channel PMT systems with 16 to 64 elements have been commercially available, whereas the recently demonstrated CMOS single-photon avalanche diode (SPAD)-TCSPC FLIM systems can offer even higher number of detection channels and additional low-cost options.

==== Gating method ====
Pulse excitation is still used in this method. Before the pulse reaches the sample, some of the light is reflected by a dichroic mirror and gets detected by a photodiode that activates a delay generator controlling a gated optical intensifier (GOI) that sits in front of the CCD detector. The GOI only allows for detection for the fraction of time when it is open after the delay. Thus, with an adjustable delay generator, one is able to collect fluorescence emission after multiple delay times encompassing the time range of the fluorescence decay of the sample. In recent years integrated intensified CCD cameras entered the market. These cameras consist of an image intensifier, CCD sensor and an integrated delay generator. ICCD cameras with shortest gating times of down to 200ps and delay steps of 10ps allow sub-nanosecond resolution FLIM. In combination with an endoscope this technique is used for intraoperative diagnosis of brain tumors.

=== Phase modulation ===
Fluorescence lifetimes can be determined in the frequency domain by a phase-modulation method. The method uses a light source that is pulsed or modulated at high frequency (up to 500 MHz) such as an LED, diode laser or a continuous wave source combined with an electro-optic modulator or an acousto-optic modulator. The fluorescence is (a.) demodulated and (b.) phase shifted; both quantities are related to the characteristic decay times of the fluorophore. Also, y-components to the excitation and fluorescence sine waves will be modulated, and lifetime can be determined from the modulation ratio of these y-components. Hence, 2 values for the lifetime can be determined from the phase-modulation method. The lifetimes are determined through a fitting procedure of these experimental parameters. An advantage of PMT-based or camera-based frequency domain FLIM is its fast lifetime image acquisition making it suitable for applications such as live cell research.

== Analysis ==
The goal of the analysis algorithm is to extract the pure decay curve from the measured decay and to estimate the lifetime(s). The latter is usually accomplished by fitting single or multi exponential functions. A variety of methods have been developed to solve this problem. The most widely used technique is the least square iterative re-convolution which is based on the minimization of the weighted sum of the residuals. In this technique theoretical exponential decay curves are convoluted with the instrument response function, which is measured separately, and the best fit is found by iterative calculation of the residuals for different inputs until a minimum is found. For a set of observations $d({{t}_{i}})$ of the fluorescence signal in time bin i, the lifetime estimation is carried out by minimization of:

${{\chi }^{2}}=\sum\limits_{i}{{{\left[ {{d}_{i}}({{t}_{i}})-{{d}_{0i}}({{t}_{i}},a,\tau ) \right]}^{2}}}$

Besides experimental difficulties, including the wavelength dependent instrument response function, mathematical treatment of the iterative de-convolution problem is not straightforward and it is a slow process which in the early days of FLIM made it impractical for a pixel-by-pixel analysis. Non fitting methods are attractive because they offer a very fast solution to lifetime estimation. One of the major and straightforward techniques in this category is the rapid lifetime determination (RLD) method. RLD calculates the lifetimes and their amplitudes directly by dividing the decay curve into two parts of equal width $\delta$t. The analysis is performed by integrating the decay curve in equal time intervals $\delta$t:

$$\begin{matrix}
{{D}_{0}}=\sum\limits_{i=1}^{K/2}{{{I}_{i}}\delta t} & {{D}_{1}}=\sum\limits_{i=K/2}^{K}{{{I}_{i}}\delta t}  \\
\end{matrix}$$

Ii is the recorded signal in the i-th channel and K is the number of channels. The lifetime can be estimated using:

$\tau =\delta t/\ln ({{D}_{0}}/{{D}_{1}})$

For multi exponential decays this equation provides the average lifetime. This method can be extended to analyze bi-exponential decays. One major drawback of this method is that it cannot take into account the instrument response effect and for this reason the early part of the measured decay curves should be ignored in the analyses. This means that part of the signal is discarded and the accuracy for estimating short lifetimes goes down.

One of the interesting features of the convolution theorem is that the integral of the convolution is the product of the factors that make up the integral. There are a few techniques which work in transformed space that exploit this property to recover the pure decay curve from the measured curve. Laplace and Fourier transformation along with Laguerre gauss expansion have been used to estimate the lifetime in transformed space. These approaches are faster than the deconvolution based methods but they suffer from truncation and sampling problems. Moreover, application of methods like Laguerre gauss expansion is mathematically complicated. In Fourier methods the lifetime of a single exponential decay curve is given by:

$\tau =\frac{1}{n\omega }\frac{{{A}_{n}}}{{{B}_{n}}}$

Where:

$$\begin{matrix}
{{A}_{n}}=\frac{\sum\limits_{t}{d(t)\sin (n\omega t)}}{\sum\limits_{t}{IRF(t)\sin (n\omega t)}}=\frac{\omega \tau }{1+{{\omega }^{2}}{{\tau }^{2}}}, & {{B}_{n}}=\frac{\sum\limits_{t}{d(t)\cos (n\omega t)}}{\sum\limits_{t}{IRF\cos (n\omega t)}}=\frac{1}{1+n{{\omega }^{2}}{{\tau }^{2}}}, & \omega =\frac{2\pi }{T}  \\
\end{matrix}$$

and n is the harmonic number and T is the total time range of detection.

== Applications ==
FLIM has primarily been used in biology as a method to detect photosensitizers in cells and tumors as well as FRET in instances where ratiometric imaging is difficult. The technique was developed in the late 1980s and early 1990s (Gating method: Bugiel et al. 1989. König 1989, Phase modulation: Lakowicz at al. 1992,) before being more widely applied in the late 1990s. In cell culture, it has been used to study EGF receptor signaling and trafficking. Time domain FLIM (tdFLIM) has also been used to show the interaction of both types of nuclear intermediate filament proteins lamins A and B1 in distinct homopolymers at the nuclear envelope, which further interact with each other in higher order structures. FLIM imaging is particularly useful in neurons, where light scattering by brain tissue is problematic for ratiometric imaging. In neurons, FLIM imaging using pulsed illumination has been used to study Ras, CaMKII, Rac, and Ran family proteins. FLIM has been used in clinical multiphoton tomography to detect intradermal cancer cells as well as pharmaceutical and cosmetic compounds.

More recently FLIM has also been used to detect flavanols in plant cells.

=== Autofluorescent coenzymes NAD(P)H and FAD ===
Multi-photon FLIM is increasingly used to detect auto-fluorescence from coenzymes as markers for changes in mammalian metabolism.

=== FRET imaging ===
Since the fluorescence lifetime of a fluorophore depends on both radiative (i.e. fluorescence) and non-radiative (i.e. quenching, FRET) processes, energy transfer from the donor molecule to the acceptor molecule will decrease the lifetime of the donor. Thus, FRET measurements using FLIM can provide a method to discriminate between the states/environments of the fluorophore. In contrast to intensity-based FRET measurements, the FLIM-based FRET measurements are also insensitive to the concentration of fluorophores and can thus filter out artifacts introduced by variations in the concentration and emission intensity across the sample.

== See also ==
- Phasor approach to fluorescence lifetime and spectral imaging
