= Single-photon avalanche diode =

Solid-state photodetector

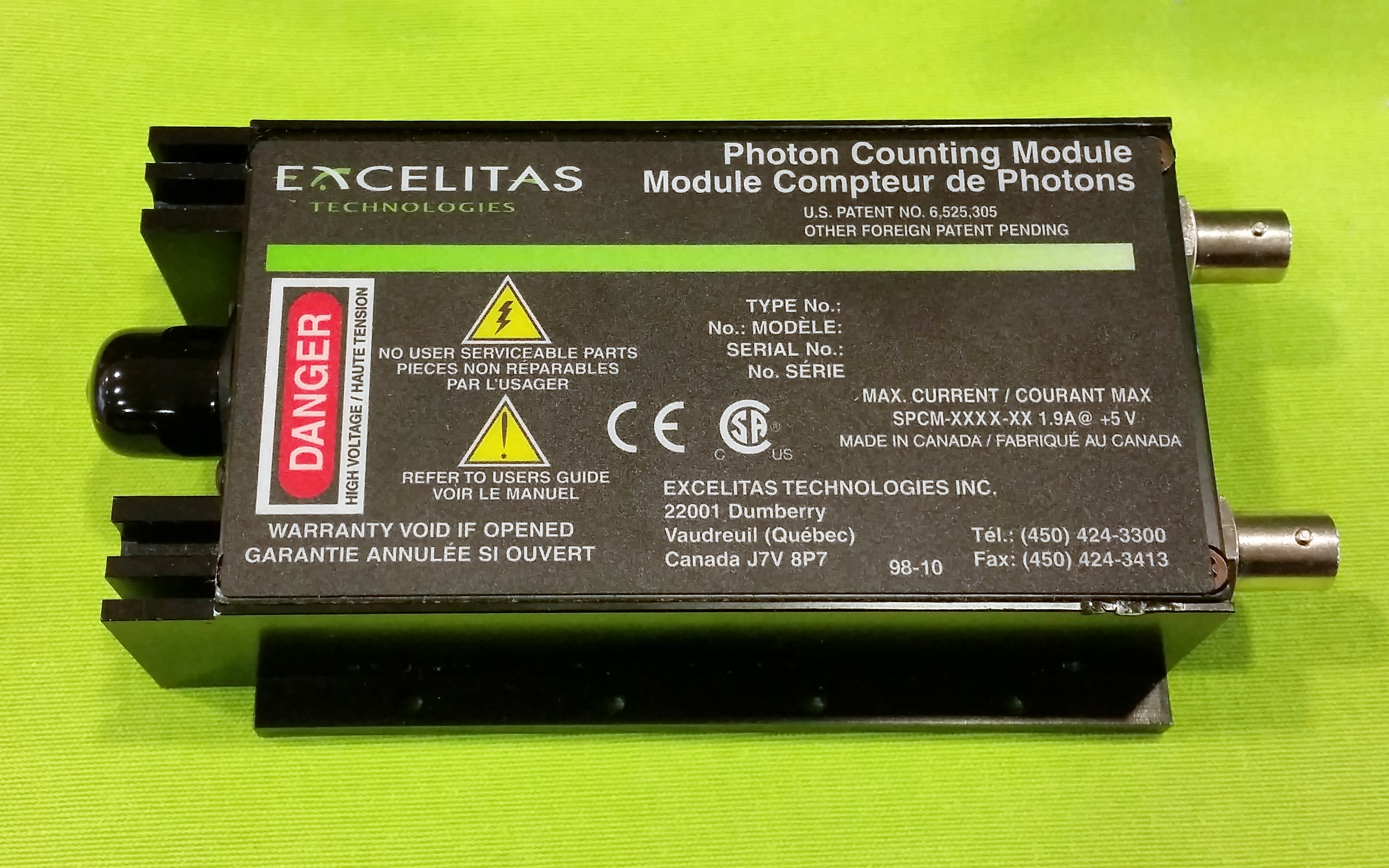
Commercial single-photon avalanche diode module for optical photons

A single-photon avalanche diode (SPAD), also called Geiger-mode avalanche photodiode (G-APD or GM-APD) is a solid-state photodetector within the same family as photodiodes and avalanche photodiodes (APDs), while also being fundamentally linked with basic diode behaviours. As with photodiodes and APDs, a SPAD is based around a semi-conductor p-n junction that can be illuminated with ionizing radiation such as gamma, x-rays, beta and alpha particles along with a wide portion of the electromagnetic spectrum from ultraviolet (UV) through the visible wavelengths and into the infrared (IR).

In a photodiode, with a low reverse bias voltage, the leakage current changes linearly with absorption of photons, i.e. the liberation of current carriers (electrons and/or holes) due to the internal photoelectric effect. However, in a SPAD, the reverse bias is so high that a phenomenon called impact ionisation occurs which is able to cause an avalanche current to develop. Simply, a photo-generated carrier is accelerated by the electric field in the device to a kinetic energy which is enough to overcome the ionisation energy of the bulk material, knocking electrons out of an atom. A large avalanche of current carriers grows exponentially and can be triggered from as few as a single photon-initiated carrier. A SPAD is able to detect single photons providing short duration trigger pulses that can be counted. However, they can also be used to obtain the time of arrival of the incident photon due to the high speed that the avalanche builds up and the device's low timing jitter.

The fundamental difference between SPADs and APDs or photodiodes, is that a SPAD is biased well above its reverse-bias breakdown voltage and has a structure that allows operation without damage or undue noise. While an APD is able to act as a linear amplifier, the level of impact ionisation and avalanche within the SPAD has prompted researchers to liken the device to a Geiger-counter in which output pulses indicate a trigger or "click" event. The diode bias region that gives rise to this "click" type behaviour is therefore called the "Geiger-mode" region.

As with photodiodes the wavelength region in which it is most sensitive is a product of its material properties, in particular the energy bandgap within the semiconductor. Many materials including silicon, germanium, germanium on silicon and III-V elements such as InGaAs/InP have been used to fabricate SPADs for the large variety of applications that now utilise the run-away avalanche process. There is much research in this topic with activity implementing SPAD-based systems in CMOS fabrication technologies, and investigation and use of III-V material combinations and Ge on Si for single-photon detection at short-wave infrared wavelengths suitable for telecommunications applications.

== Applications ==
Since the 1970s, the applications of SPADs have increased significantly. Recent examples of their use include LIDAR, time of flight (ToF) 3D imaging, PET scanning, single-photon experimentation within physics, fluorescence lifetime microscopy, optical communications (particularly quantum key distribution), digital night vision, and ultrahigh sensitivity cameras.

== Operation ==
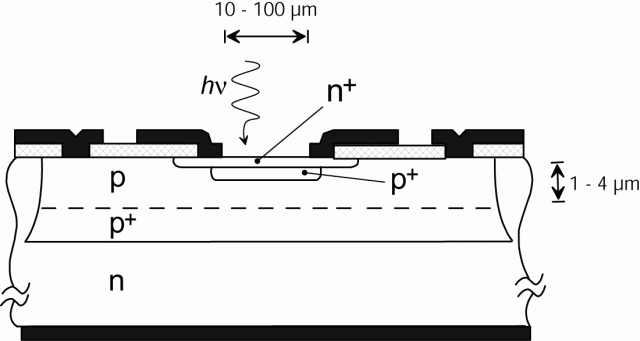
Figure 1 - Thin SPAD cross-section.

=== Structures ===
SPADs are semiconductor devices that are based on a p–n junction that is reverse-biased at an operating voltage that exceeds the junction's breakdown voltage (Figure 1). "At this bias, the electric field is so high [higher than 3×10^{5} V/cm] that a single charge carrier injected into the depletion layer can trigger a self-sustaining avalanche. The current rises swiftly [sub-nanosecond rise-time] to a macroscopic steady level in the milliampere range. If the primary carrier is photo-generated, the leading edge of the avalanche pulse marks [with picosecond time jitter] the arrival time of the detected photon." The current continues until the avalanche is quenched by lowering the bias voltage down to or below the breakdown voltage: the lower electric field is no longer able to accelerate carriers to impact-ionize with lattice atoms, therefore current ceases. In order to be able to detect another photon, the bias voltage must be raised again above breakdown.

"This operation requires a suitable circuit, which has to:

1. Sense the leading edge of the avalanche current.
2. Generate a standard output pulse synchronous with the avalanche build-up.
3. Quench the avalanche by lowering the bias down to the breakdown voltage.
4. Restore the photodiode to the operative level.

This circuit is usually referred to as a quenching circuit."

=== Biasing regions and current-voltage characteristic ===
Current-voltage characteristic of a SPAD showing the off- and on-branch

A semiconductor p-n junction can be biased at several operating regions depending on the applied voltage. For normal uni-directional diode operation, the forward biasing region and the forward voltage are used during conduction, while the reverse bias region prevents conduction. When operated with a low reverse bias voltage, the p-n junction can operate as a unity gain photodiode. As the reverse bias increases, some internal gain through carrier multiplication can occur allowing the photodiode to operate as an avalanche photodiode (APD) with a stable gain and a linear response to the optical input signal. However, as the bias voltage continues to increase, the p-n junction breaks down when the electric field strength across the p-n junction reaches a critical level. As this electric field is induced by the bias voltage over the junction it is denoted as the breakdown voltage, VBD. A SPAD is reverse biased with an excess bias voltage, V_{ex}, above the breakdown voltage, but below a second, higher breakdown voltage associated with the SPAD's guard ring. The total bias (VBD+V_{ex}) therefore exceeds the breakdown voltage to such a degree that "At this bias, the electric field is so high [higher than 3×10^{5} V/cm] that a single charge carrier injected into the depletion layer can trigger a self-sustaining avalanche. The current rises swiftly [sub-nanosecond rise-time] to a macroscopic steady level in the milliampere range. If the primary carrier is photo-generated, the leading edge of the avalanche pulse marks [with picosecond time jitter] the arrival time of the detected photon".

As the current vs voltage (I-V) characteristic of a p-n junction gives information about the conduction behaviour of the diode, this is often measured using an analogue curve-tracer. This sweeps the bias voltage in fine steps under tightly controlled laboratory conditions. For a SPAD, without photon arrivals or thermally generated carriers, the I-V characteristic is similar to the reverse characteristic of a standard semi-conductor diode, i.e. an almost total blockage of charge flow (current) over the junction other than a small leakage current (nano-amperes). This condition can be described as an "off-branch" of the characteristic.

However, when this experiment is conducted, a "flickering" effect and a second I-V characteristic can be observed beyond breakdown. This occurs when the SPAD has experienced a triggering event (photon arrival or thermally generated carrier) during the voltage sweeps that are applied to the device. The SPAD, during these sweeps, sustains an avalanche current which is described as the "on-branch" of the I-V characteristic. As the curve tracer increases the magnitude of the bias voltage over time, there are times that the SPAD is triggered during the voltage sweep above breakdown. In this case a transition occurs from the off-branch to the on-branch, with an appreciable current starting to flow. This leads to the flickering of the I-V characteristic that is observed and was denoted by early researchers in the field as "bifurcation" (def: the division of something into two branches or parts). To detect single-photons successfully, the p-n junction must have very low levels of the internal generation and recombination processes. To reduce thermal generation, devices are often cooled, while phenomena such as tunnelling across the p-n junctions also need to be reduced through careful design of semi-conductor dopants and implant steps. Finally, to reduce noise mechanisms being exacerbated by trapping centres within the p-n junction's band gap structure the diode needs to have a "clean" process free of erroneous dopants.

=== Passive quenching circuits ===
The simplest quenching circuit is commonly called passive quenching circuit and comprises a single resistor in series with the SPAD. This experimental setup has been employed since the early studies on the avalanche breakdown in junctions. The avalanche current self-quenches simply because it develops a voltage drop across a high-value ballast load R_{L} (about 100 kΩ or more). After the quenching of the avalanche current, the SPAD bias slowly recovers to the operating bias, and therefore the detector is ready to be ignited again. This circuit mode is therefore called passive quenching passive reset (PQPR), although an active circuit element can be used for reset forming a passive quench active reset (PQAR) circuit mode. A detailed description of the quenching process is reported by Zappa et al.

=== Active quenching circuits ===
A more advanced quenching, which was explored from the 1970s onwards, is a scheme called active quenching. In this case a fast discriminator senses the steep onset of the avalanche current across a 50 Ω resistor (or integrated transistor) and provides a digital (CMOS, TTL, ECL, NIM) output pulse, synchronous with the photon arrival time. The circuit then quickly reduces the bias voltage to below breakdown (active quenching), then relatively quickly returns bias to above the breakdown voltage ready to sense the next photon. This mode is called active quench active reset (AQAR), however depending on circuit requirements, active quenching passive reset (AQPR) may be more suitable. AQAR circuits often allow lower dead times, and significantly reduced dead time variation.

=== Photon counting and saturation ===
The intensity of the input signal can be obtained by counting (photon counting) the number of output pulses within a measurement time period. This is useful for applications such as low light imaging, PET scanning and fluorescence lifetime microscopy. However, while the avalanche recovery circuit is quenching the avalanche and restoring bias, the SPAD cannot detect further photon arrivals. Any photons, (or dark counts or after-pulses), that reach the detector during this brief period are not counted. As the number of photons increases such that the (statistical) time interval between photons gets within a factor of ten or so of the avalanche recovery time, missing counts become statistically significant and the count rate begins to depart from a linear relationship with detected light level. At this point the SPAD begins to saturate. If the light level were to increase further, ultimately to the point where the SPAD immediately avalanches the moment the avalanche recovery circuit restores bias, the count rate reaches a maximum defined purely by the avalanche recovery time in the case of active quenching (hundred million counts per second or more). This can be harmful to the SPAD as it will be experiencing avalanche current nearly continuously. In the passive case, saturation may lead to the count rate decreasing once the maximum is reached. This is called paralysis, whereby a photon arriving as the SPAD is passively recharging, has a lower detection probability, but can extend the dead time. It is worth noting that passive quenching, while simpler to implement in terms of circuitry, incurs a 1/e reduction in maximum counting rates.

=== Dark count rate (DCR) ===
Besides photon-generated carriers, thermally-generated carriers (through generation-recombination processes within the semiconductor) can also fire the avalanche process. Therefore, it is possible to observe output pulses when the SPAD is in complete darkness. The resulting average number of counts per second is called dark count rate (DCR) and is the key parameter in defining the detector noise. It is worth noting that the reciprocal of the dark count rate defines the mean time that the SPAD remains biased above breakdown before being triggered by an undesired thermal generation. Therefore, in order to work as a single-photon detector, the SPAD must be able to remain biased above breakdown for a sufficiently long time (e.g., a few milliseconds, corresponding to a count rate well under a thousand counts per second, cps).

=== Afterpulsing noise ===
One other effect that can trigger an avalanche is known as afterpulsing. When an avalanche occurs, the PN junction is flooded with charge carriers and trap levels between the valence and conduction band become occupied to a degree that is much greater than that expected in a thermal-equilibrium distribution of charge carriers. After the SPAD has been quenched, there is some probability that a charge carrier in a trap level receives enough energy to free it from the trap and promote it to the conduction band, which triggers a new avalanche. Thus, depending on the quality of the process and exact layers and implants that were used to fabricate the SPAD, a significant number of extra pulses can be developed from a single originating thermal or photo-generation event. The degree of afterpulsing can be quantified by measuring the autocorrelation of the times of arrival between avalanches when a dark count measurement is set up. Thermal generation produces Poissonian statistics with an impulse function autocorrelation, and afterpulsing produces non-Poissonian statistics.

=== Photon timing and jitter ===
The leading edge of a SPAD's avalanche breakdown is particularly useful for timing the arrival of photons. This method is useful for 3D imaging, LIDAR and is used heavily in physical measurements relying on time-correlated single photon counting (TCSPC). However, to enable such functionality dedicated circuits such as time-to-digital converters (TDCs) and time-to-analogue (TAC) circuits are required. The measurement of a photon's arrival is complicated by two general processes. The first is the statistical fluctuation in the arrival time of the photon itself, which is a fundamental property of light. The second is the statistical variation in the detection mechanism within the SPAD due to a) depth of photon absorption, b) diffusion time to the active p-n junction, c) the build up statistics of the avalanche and d) the jitter of the detection and timing circuitry.

=== Optical fill factor ===
For a single SPAD, the ratio of its optically sensitive area, A_{act}, to its total area, A_{tot}, is called the fill factor, FF = (A_{act} / A_{tot}) × 100%. As SPADs require a guard ring to prevent premature edge breakdown, the optical fill factor becomes a product of the diode shape and size with relation its guard ring. If the active area is large and the outer guard ring is thin, the device will have a high fill factor. With a single device, the most efficient method to ensure full utilisation of the area and maximum sensitivity is to focus the incoming optical signal to be within the device's active area, i.e. all incident photons are absorbed within the planar area of the p-n junction such that any photon within this area can trigger an avalanche.

Fill factor is more applicable when we consider arrays of SPAD devices. Here the diode active area may be small or commensurate with the guard ring's area. Likewise, the fabrication process of the SPAD array may put constraints on the separation of one guard ring to another, i.e. the minimum separation of SPADs. This leads to the situation where the area of the array becomes dominated by guard ring and separation regions rather than optically receptive p-n junctions. The fill factor is made worse when circuitry must be included within the array as this adds further separation between optically receptive regions. One method to mitigate this issue is to increase the active area of each SPAD in the array such that guard rings and separation are no longer dominant, however for CMOS integrated SPADs the erroneous detections caused by dark counts increases as the diode size increases.

==== Geometric improvements ====
One of the first methods to increase fill factors in arrays of circular SPADs was to offset the alignment of alternate rows such that the curve of one SPAD partially uses the area between the two SPADs on an adjacent row. This was effective but complicated the routing and layout of the array.

To address fill factor limitations within SPAD arrays formed of circular SPADs, other shapes are utilised as these are known to have higher maximum area values within a typically square pixel area and have higher packing ratios. A square SPAD within a square pixel achieves the highest fill factor, however the sharp corners of this geometry are known to cause premature breakdown of the device, despite a guard ring and consequently produce SPADs with high dark count rates. To compromise, square SPADs with sufficiently rounded corners have been fabricated. These are termed Fermat shaped SPADs while the shape itself is a super-ellipse or a Lamé curve. This nomenclature is common in the SPAD literature, however the Fermat curve refers to a special case of the super-ellipse that puts restrictions on the ratio of the shape's length, "a" and width, "b" (they must be the same, a = b = 1) and restricts the degree of the curve "n" to be even integers (2, 4, 6, 8 etc.). The degree "n" controls the curvature of the shape's corners. Ideally, to optimise the shape of the diode for both low noise and a high fill factor, the shape's parameters should be free of these restrictions.

To minimise the spacing between SPAD active areas, researchers have removed all active circuitry from the arrays and have also explored the use of NMOS only CMOS SPAD arrays to remove SPAD guard ring to PMOS n-well spacing rules. This is of benefit but is limited by routing distances and congestion into the centre SPADs for larger arrays. The concept has been extended to develop arrays that use clusters of SPADs in so-called mini-SiPM arrangements whereby a smaller array is provided with its active circuitry at one edge, allowing a second small array to be abutted on a different edge. This reduced the routing difficulties by keeping the number of diodes in the cluster manageable and creating the required number of SPADs in total from collections of those clusters.

A significant jump in fill factor and array pixel pitch was achieved by sharing the deep n-well of the SPADs in CMOS processes, and more recently also sharing portions of the guard-ring structure. This removed one of the major guard-ring to guard-ring separation rules and allowed the fill-factor to increase towards 60 or 70%. The n-well and guard ring sharing idea has been crucial in efforts towards lowering pixel pitch and increasing the total number of diodes in the array. Recently SPAD pitches have been reduced to 3.0 um and 2.2 um.

Porting a concept from photodiodes and APDs, researchers have also investigated the use of drift electric fields within the CMOS substrate to attract photo generated carriers towards a SPAD's active p-n junction. By doing so a large optical collection area can be achieved with a smaller SPAD region.

Another concept ported from CMOS image sensor technologies, is the exploration of stacked p-n junctions similar to Foveon sensors. The idea being that higher-energy photons (blue) tend to be absorbed at a short absorption depth, i.e. near the silicon surface. Red and infra-red photons (lower energy) travel deeper into the silicon. If there is a junction at that depth, red and IR sensitivity can be improved.

==== IC fabrication improvements ====
With the advancement of 3D IC technologies, i.e. stacking of integrated circuits, the fill factor could be enhanced further by allowing the top die to be optimised for a high fill-factor SPAD array, and the lower die for readout circuits and signal processing. As small dimension, high-speed processes for transistors may require different optimisations than optically sensitive diodes, 3D-ICs allow the layers to be separately optimised.

==== Pixel-level optical improvements ====
As with CMOS image sensors micro-lenses can be fabricated on the SPAD pixel array to focus light into the centre of the SPAD. As with a single SPAD, this allows light to only hit the sensitive regions and avoid both the guard ring and any routing that is needed within the array. This has also recently included Fresnel type lenses. Within a single SPAD pixel, the sensitive region can be engineered as an optical metamaterial to create a wide variety of tailored absorption profiles.

==== Pixel pitch ====
The above fill-factor enhancement methods, mostly concentrating on SPAD geometry along with other advancements, have led SPAD arrays to recently push the 1 mega pixel barrier. While this lags CMOS image sensors (with pitches now below 0.8 um), this is a product of both the youth of the research field (with CMOS SPADs introduced in 2003) and the complications of high voltages, avalanche multiplication within the silicon and the required spacing rules.

== Comparison with APDs ==
While both APDs and SPADs are semiconductor p-n junctions that are heavily reverse biased, the principle difference in their properties is derived from their different biasing points upon the reverse I-V characteristic, i.e. the reverse voltage applied to their junction. An APD, in comparison to a SPAD, is not biased above its breakdown voltage. This is because the multiplication of charge carriers is known to occur prior to the breakdown of the device with this being utilised to achieve a stable gain that varies with the applied voltage. For optical detection applications, the resulting avalanche and subsequent current in its biasing circuit is linearly related to the optical signal intensity. The APD is therefore useful to achieve moderate up-front amplification of low-intensity optical signals but is often combined with a trans-impedance amplifier (TIA) as the APD's output is a current rather than the voltage of a typical amplifier. The resultant signal is a non-distorted, amplified version of the input, allowing for the measurement of complex processes that modulate the amplitude of the incident light. The internal multiplication gain factors for APDs vary by application, however typical values are of the order of a few hundred. The avalanche of carriers is not divergent in this operating region, while the avalanche present in SPADs quickly builds into a run-away (divergent) condition.

In comparison, SPADs operate at a bias voltage above the breakdown voltage. This is such a highly unstable above-breakdown regime that a single photon or a single dark-current electron can trigger a significant avalanche of carriers. The semiconductor p-n junction breaks down completely, and a significant current is developed. A single photon can trigger a current spike equivalent to billions of billions of electrons per second (with this being dependent on the physical size of the device and its bias voltage). This allows subsequent electronic circuits to easily count such trigger events. As the device produces a trigger event, the concept of gain is not strictly compatible. However, as the photon detection efficiency (PDE) of SPADs varies with the reverse bias voltage, gain, in a general conceptual sense can be used to distinguish devices that are heavily biased and therefore highly sensitive in comparison to lightly biased and therefore of lower sensitivity. While APDs can amplify an input signal preserving any changes in amplitude, SPADs distort the signal into a series of trigger or pulse events. The output can still be treated as proportional to the input signal intensity, however it is now transformed into the frequency of trigger events, i.e. pulse frequency modulation (PFM). Pulses can be counted giving an indication of the input signal's optical intensity, while pulses can trigger timing circuits to provide accurate time-of-arrival measurements.

One crucial issue present in APDs is multiplication noise induced by the statistical variation of the avalanche multiplication process. This leads to a corresponding noise factor on the output amplified photo current. Statistical variation in the avalanche is also present in SPAD devices, however due to the runaway process it is often manifest as timing jitter on the detection event.

Along with their bias region, there are also structural differences between APDs and SPADs, principally due to the increased reverse bias voltages required and the need for SPADs to have a long quiescent period between noise trigger events to be suitable for the single-photon level signals to be measured.

== History, development and early pioneers ==
The history and development of SPADs and APDs shares a number of important points with the development of solid-state technologies such as diodes and early p–n junction transistors (particularly war-efforts at Bell Labs). John Townsend in 1901 and 1903 investigated the ionisation of trace gases within vacuum tubes, finding that as the electric potential increased, gaseous atoms and molecules could become ionised by the kinetic energy of free electrons accelerated though the electric field. The new liberated electrons were then themselves accelerated by the field, producing new ionisations once their kinetic energy has reached sufficient levels. This theory was later instrumental in the development of the thyratron and the Geiger-Mueller tube. The Townsend discharge was also instrumental as a base theory for electron multiplication phenomena, (both DC and AC), within both silicon and germanium.

However, the major advances in early discovery and utilisation of the avalanche gain mechanism were a product of the study of Zener breakdown, related (avalanche) breakdown mechanisms and structural defects in early silicon and germanium transistor and p–n junction devices. These defects were called 'microplasmas' and are critical in the history of APDs and SPADs. Likewise investigation of the light detection properties of p–n junctions is crucial, especially the early 1940s findings of Russel Ohl. Light detection in semiconductors and solids through the internal photoelectric effect is older with Foster Nix pointing to the work of Gudden and Pohl in the 1920s, who use the phrase primary and secondary to distinguish the internal and external photoelectric effects respectively. In the 1950s and 1960s, significant effort was made to reduce the number of microplasma breakdown and noise sources, with artificial microplasmas being fabricated for study. It became clear that the avalanche mechanism could be useful for signal amplification within the diode itself, as both light and alpha particles were used for the study of these devices and breakdown mechanisms.

In the early 2000s, SPADs have been implemented within CMOS processes. This has radically increased their performance (dark count rate, jitter, array pixel pitch, etc.), and has leveraged analog and digital circuits that can be implemented alongside these devices. Notable circuits include photon counting using fast digital counters, photon timing using both time-to-digital converters (TDCs) and time-to-analog converters (TACs), passive quenching circuits using either NMOS or PMOS transistors in place of poly-silicon resistors, active quenching and reset circuits for high counting rates, and many on-chip digital signal processing blocks. Such devices are now reaching optical fill factors of >70%, with >1024 SPADs, with DCRs < 10 Hz, jitter values in the 50ps region, and dead times of 1-2ns. Recent devices leverage 3D-IC technologies such as through-silicon-vias (TSVs) to present a high-fill-factor SPAD optimised top CMOS layer (90 nm or 65 nm node) with a dedicated signal processing and readout CMOS layer (45 nm node). Significant advancements in the noise terms for SPADs have been obtained by silicon process modelling tools such as TCAD, where guard rings, junction depths and device structures and shapes can be optimised prior to validation by experimental SPAD structures.

== See also ==
- Avalanche photodiode (APD)
- Oversampled binary image sensor
- p–n junction
- Silicon photomultiplier (SiPM)
