= AstroSat-2 =

Proposed Indian space telescope

- Mission type: Space telescope
- Operator: ISRO

Spacecraft properties
- Manufacturer: ISRO

Start of mission
- Launch date: TBD
- Contractor: ISRO

AstroSat-2 is India's second dedicated multi-wavelength space telescope, proposed by ISRO as the successor of the current AstroSat observatory, which had a five-year operational time yet still is functioning.

ISRO launched an 'Announcement of Opportunity' in February 2018 requesting proposals from Indian scientists for ideas and the development of instruments for astronomy and astrophysics.

== Background ==
AstroSat-2 follows AstroSat-1, a 1,515 kg observatory launched on 28 September 2015 on a PSLV-C30 rocket in the PSLV-XL configuration from Sriharikota. AstroSat-1 was placed in a 650 km orbit with a planned lifespan of five years. Its launch brought India into the select group of countries with their own space observatory, alongside the United States, Japan, Russia and Europe. It has been described as an indigenous counterpart to the Hubble Space Telescope, which is about eight times heavier. Space telescopes avoid problems that affect ground-based observatories, such as light pollution and distortion of electromagnetic radiation.

== Instruments ==
ISRO asked astronomy institutions for proposals to develop scientific instruments on 3 February 2018, and the plan for AstroSat-2 was reported in The Times of India later that month. At the time, AstroSat-1 had about two more years of its planned five-year life remaining, and ISRO said it was preparing to send up AstroSat-2 to continue studies in astronomy and astrophysics. AstroSat observations are proposal-driven: the observatory's own Announcement of Opportunity for outside observers took effect about a year after launch, so a successor mission would similarly rely on proposals from the Indian scientific community.

== See also ==
- List of space telescopes
- Indian Astronomical Observatory
- List of space telescopes
- Ultraviolet astronomy
- X-ray astronomy
