= Silicon photomultiplier =

Extremely sensitive solid-state photodetector

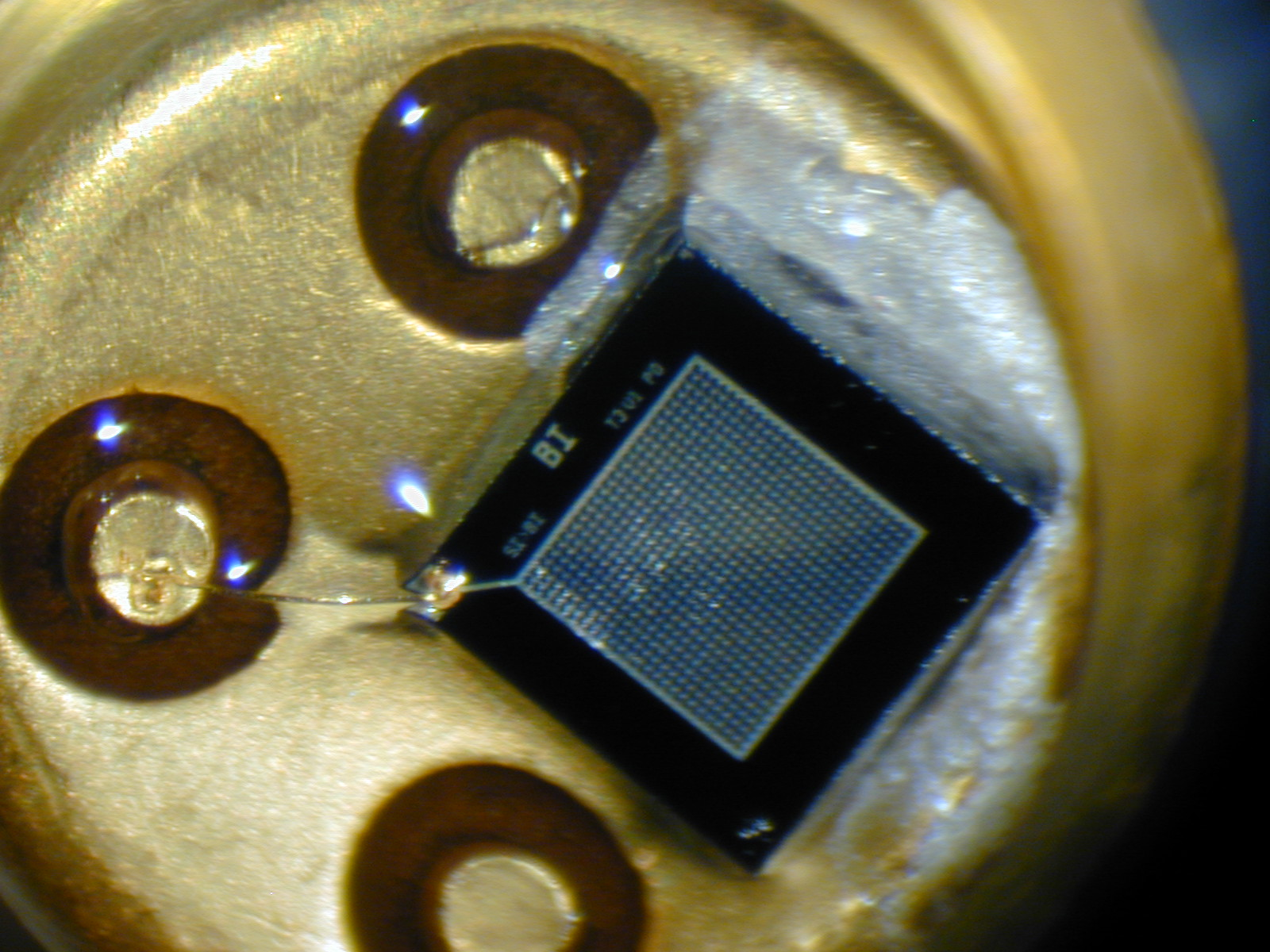
One of the first SiPM produced by FBK research center (formerly IRST) located in Trento, Italy.

In solid-state electronics, silicon photomultipliers (SiPMs) are single-photon-sensitive devices based on pixels of single-photon avalanche diodes (SPADs) implemented on common silicon substrate. The dimension of each single avalanche diode can vary from 10 to 100 micrometres, with a typical density of up to 1,000 pixels/mm^{2}. Every avalanche diode in a SiPM operates in Geiger mode and is coupled with the others by a metal or polysilicon quenching resistor. Although the device works in digital/switching mode, most SiPMs are analog devices because the microcells are read in parallel, making it possible to generate signals with a dynamic range from a single photon to 1000 photons for a device with just a square-millimeter area. More advanced readout schemes are used for lidar applications. The supply voltage (V_{b}) depends on the APD technology used and typically varies between 20 V and 100 V, thus being from 15 to 75 times lower than the voltage required for traditional photomultiplier tube (PMT) operation.

Typical specifications for a SiPM:

- Photo detection efficiency (PDE) ranges from 20 to 50%, depending on device and wavelength, being similar to a traditional PMT
- Gain (G) is also similar to a PMT, being about 10^{6}
- G vs. V_{b} dependence is linear and does not follow a power law like in the case of PMTs
- Timing jitter is optimized to have a photon arrival time resolution of about 100-300 ps
- Signal decay time is inversely proportional to square root of photoelectrons number within an excitation event
- The signal parameters are practically independent of external magnetic fields, in contrast to vacuum PMTs
- Afterpulsing probability (3-30%), defined as probability of spurious second pulses after single photon arrival
- Dark count density is frequency of pulses in absence of illumination (10^{5}-10^{6} pulses/s/mm^{2})
- Small dimensions and lower voltages permit extremely compact, light and robust mechanical design

SiPMs are attractive candidates for the replacement of the conventional PMT in positron emission tomography (PET) and SPECT imaging, since they provide high gain with low voltage, fast response, are very compact, and are compatible with magnetic resonance setups. They also hold promise as photon-detectors in high-energy physics calorimetry and astrophysics. Nevertheless, there are still several challenges, for example, SiPM requires optimization for larger matrices, signal amplification and digitization.

== Comparison to vacuum tube photomultipliers ==
=== Advantages ===
Compared to conventional PMTs, the photoelectron gain in SiPMs is typically more deterministic, resulting in low or even negligible excess noise factor. As a result, the SNR (Signal-to-noise ratio) for a fixed number of detected photons can be higher than that from a PMT. Conversely, the stochastic gain of a PMT typically requires more detected photons to obtain the same SNR.

Mass production of silicon electronics by multiple vendors allows SiPMs to be made very cheaply relative to vacuum tubes.

Bias voltages are 10-100x times lower, simplifying electronics.

In the red to near-infrared, silicon enables much higher quantum efficiency than available PMT photocathode materials.

Dynamic range can be orders of magnitude larger than a PMT if large numbers of SPADs are arrayed together, enabling faster imaging rates or higher SNR without saturation.

They are used in space telescopes as a readout channel, like in The Gamma-ray Transients Monitor, the first astronomical satellite by Taiwan.

=== Disadvantages ===
Dark current is typically much higher at a given temperature than a PMT. Thus, a SiPM may require subambient cooling while a PMT used in the same application may not, resulting in increased complexity and cost. Similarly, obtaining large active areas may be difficult due to higher dark counts per area than in PMTs.

The impulse response of a SiPM has a complex, multiexponential shape. Relative to a PMT, obtaining a symmetric pulse shape or uniform frequency response may require more complex analog filtering or pulse shaping electronics.

== Comparison to avalanche photodiodes ==
Conventional avalanche photodiodes (APDs) also produce an amplified analog current in response to light absorption. However, in an APD, the total gain is much lower and the excess noise factor much higher. Conversely, quantum efficiency can be higher and dark noise lower.

== See also ==
- Photomultiplier tube
