= Phototube =

Light-sensitive gas-filled or vacuum tube

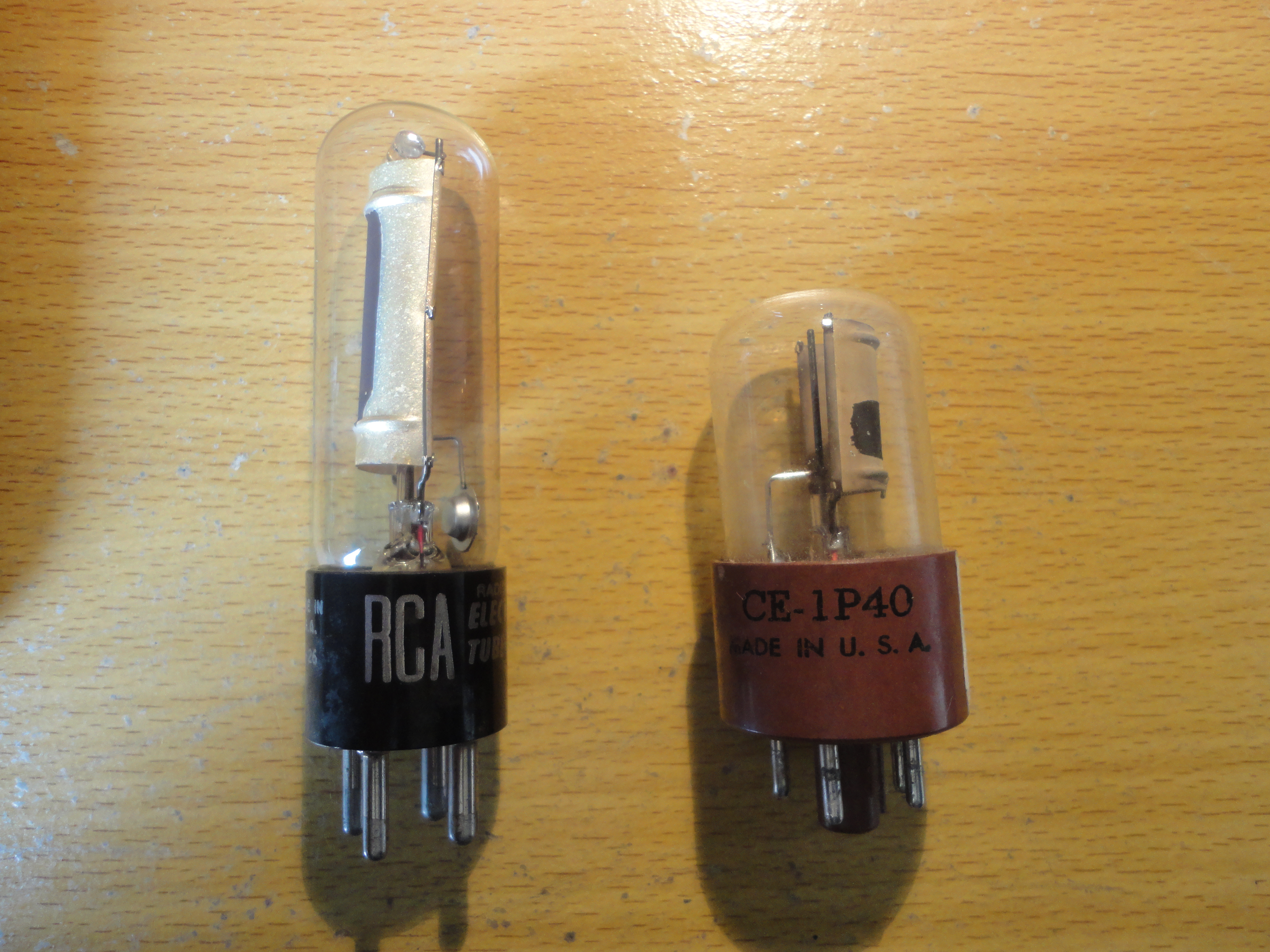
Two different types of phototubes

A phototube or photoelectric cell is a type of gas-filled or vacuum tube that is sensitive to light. Such a tube is more correctly called a 'photoemissive cell' to distinguish it from photovoltaic or photoconductive cells. Phototubes were previously more widely used but are now replaced in many applications by solid state photodetectors. The photomultiplier tube is one of the most sensitive light detectors, and is still widely used in physics research.

== Operating principles ==
Phototubes operate according to the photoelectric effect: Incoming photons strike a photocathode, knocking electrons out of its surface, which are attracted to an anode. Thus current is dependent on the frequency and intensity of incoming photons. Unlike photomultiplier tubes, no amplification takes place, so the current through the device is typically of the order of a few microamperes.

The light wavelength range over which the device is sensitive depends on the material used for the photoemissive cathode. A caesium-antimony cathode gives a device that is very sensitive in the violet to ultra-violet region with sensitivity falling off to blindness to red light. Caesium on oxidised silver gives a cathode that is most sensitive to infra-red to red light, falling off towards blue, where the sensitivity is low but not zero.

Vacuum devices have a near constant anode current for a given level of illumination relative to anode voltage. Gas-filled devices are more sensitive, but the frequency response to modulated illumination falls off at lower frequencies compared to the vacuum devices. The frequency response of vacuum devices is generally limited by the transit time of the electrons from cathode to anode.

== Applications ==
One major application of the phototube was the reading of optical sound tracks for projected films. Phototubes were used in a variety of light-sensing applications until some were superseded by photoresistors and photodiodes.
