= AstroSat =

Space observatory

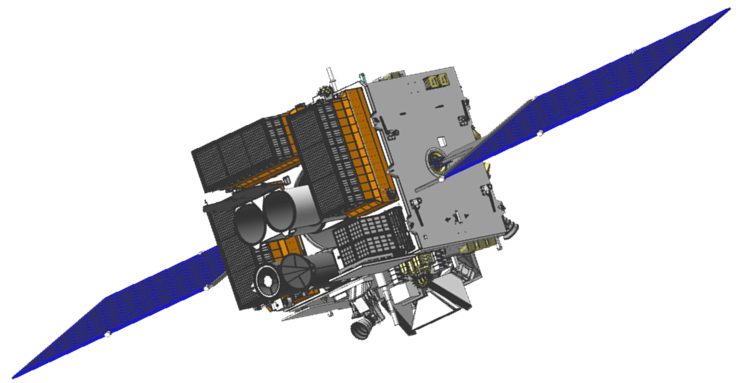
- Mission type: Space telescope
- Operator: ISRO
- COSPAR ID: 2015-052A
- SATCAT no.: 40930
- Website: astrosat.iucaa.in
- Mission duration: Planned: 5 years Elapsed : 11 years, 1 month, 2 days

Spacecraft properties
- Spacecraft: AstroSat
- Launch mass: 1,513 kg (3,336 lb)

Start of mission
- Launch date: September 28, 2015
- Rocket: PSLV-C30
- Launch site: Satish Dhawan Space Centre First Launch Pad
- Contractor: ISRO

Orbital parameters
- Reference system: Geocentric
- Regime: Near-equatorial
- Semi-major axis: 7020 km
- Perigee altitude: 643.5 km
- Apogee altitude: 654.9 km
- Inclination: 6.0°
- Period: 97.6 min

Main telescope
- Wavelengths: Far Ultraviolet to hard X-ray

Instruments
- UVIT; SXT; LAXPC; CZTI; SSM; CPM

AstroSat is India's first dedicated multi-wavelength space telescope. It was launched on a PSLV-XL on 28 September 2015. With the success of this satellite, ISRO has proposed launching AstroSat-2 as a successor for AstroSat.

== Overview ==
After the success of the satellite-borne Indian X-ray Astronomy Experiment (IXAE), which was launched in 1996, the Indian Space Research Organisation (ISRO) approved further development for a full-fledged astronomy satellite, AstroSat, in 2004.

A number of astronomy research institutions in India, and abroad have jointly built instruments for the satellite. Important areas requiring coverage include studies of astrophysical objects ranging from nearby Solar System objects to distant stars and objects at cosmological distances; timing studies of variables ranging from pulsations of hot white dwarfs to those of active galactic nuclei can be conducted with AstroSat as well, with time scales ranging from milliseconds to days.

AstroSat is a multi-wavelength astronomy mission on an IRS-class satellite into a near-Earth, equatorial orbit. The five instruments on board cover the visible (320–530 nm), near UV (180–300 nm), far UV (130–180 nm), soft X-ray (0.3–8 keV and 2–10 keV) and hard X-ray (3–80 keV and 10–150 keV) regions of the electromagnetic spectrum.

The sanctioned cost of Astrosat was ₹177.85 crore (equivalent to about 20 million USD as of March 2025). Astrosat was successfully launched on 28 September 2015 from the Satish Dhawan Space Centre on board a PSLV-XL vehicle at 10:00AM.

== Mission ==
Artist's conception of a binary star system with one black hole and one main sequence star

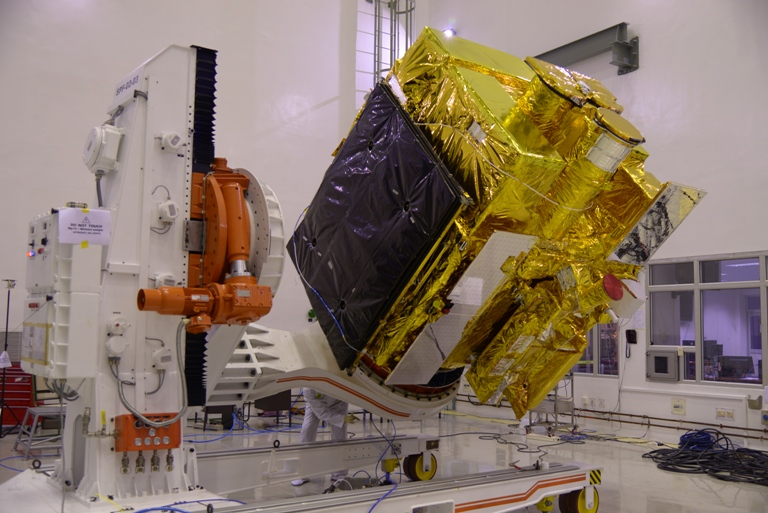
Tilted view of Astrosat

AstroSat is a proposal-driven general purpose observatory, with main scientific focus on:

- Simultaneous multi-wavelength monitoring of intensity variations in a broad range of cosmic sources
- Monitoring the X-ray sky for new transients
- Sky surveys in the hard X-ray and UV bands
- Broadband spectroscopic studies of X-ray binaries, AGN, SNRs, clusters of galaxies, and stellar coronae
- Studies of periodic and non-periodic variability of X-ray sources

AstroSat performs multi-wavelength observations covering spectral bands from radio, optical, IR, UV, and X-ray wavelengths. Both individual studies of specific sources of interest and surveys are undertaken. While radio, optical, and IR observations would be coordinated through ground-based telescopes, the high energy regions, i.e., UV, X-ray and visible wavelength, would be covered by the dedicated satellite-borne instrumentation of AstroSat.

The mission would also study near simultaneous multi-wavelength data from different variable sources. In a binary system, for example, regions near the compact object emit predominantly in the X-ray, with the accretion disc emitting most of its light in the UV/optical waveband, whereas the mass of the donating star is brightest in the optical band.

The observatory will also carry out:

- Low- to moderate-resolution spectroscopy over a wide energy band with the primary emphasis on studies of X-ray-emitting objects
- Timing studies of periodic and aperiodic phenomena in X-ray binaries
- Studies of pulsations in X-ray pulsars
- Quasi-periodic oscillations, flickering, flaring, and other variations in X-ray binaries
- Short- and long-term intensity variations in active galactic nuclei
- Time-lag studies in low/hard X-rays and UV/optical radiation
- Detection and study of X-ray transients.

In particular, the mission will train its instruments at active galactic nuclei, which are believed to contain super-massive black holes.

== Payloads ==

The scientific payload contains six instruments.

- The Ultra Violet Imaging Telescope (UVIT) performs imaging simultaneously in three channels: 130–180 nm, 180–300 nm, and 320–530 nm. The three detectors are vacuum image intensifiers manufactured by Photek, UK. The FUV detector consists of a CsI photocathode with a MgF_{2} input optic, the NUV detector consists of CsTe photocathode with a fused-silica input optic and the visible detector consists of an alkali-antimonide photocathode with a fused-silica input optic. The field of view is a circle of ~28′ diameter and the angular resolution is 1.8" for the ultraviolet channels and 2.5″ for the visible channel. In each of the three channels a spectral band can be selected through a set of filters mounted on a wheel; in addition, for the two ultraviolet channels a grating can be selected in the wheel to do slitless spectroscopy with a resolution of ~100. The primary mirror diameter of the telescope is 40 cm.
- The Soft X-ray imaging Telescope (SXT) employs focusing optics and a deep depletion CCD camera at the focal plane to perform X-ray imaging in the 0.3–8.0 keV band. The optics will consist of 41 concentric shells of gold-coated conical foil mirrors in an approximate Wolter-I configuration (the effective area of 120 cm^{2}). The focal plane CCD camera will be very similar to that flown on SWIFT XRT. The CCD will be operated at a temperature of about −80 °C by thermoelectric cooling.
- The Large Area X-ray Proportional Counter (LAXPC) covers X-ray timing and low-resolution spectral studies over a broad energy band (3–80 keV), Astrosat will use a cluster of 3 co-aligned identical Large Area X-ray Proportional Counters (LAXPCs), each with a multi-wire-multi-layer configuration and a Field of View of 1° × 1°. These detectors are designed to achieve (I) wide energy band of 3–80 keV, (II) high detection efficiency over the entire energy band, (III) narrow field of view to minimize source confusion, (IV) moderate energy resolution, (V) small internal background and (VI) long lifetime in space. The effective area of the telescope is 6000 cm^{2}.
- The Cadmium Zinc Telluride Imager (CZTI) is a hard X-ray imager. It will consist of a Pixellated Cadmium-Zinc-Telluride detector array of 500 cm^{2} effective area and the energy range from 10 to 150 kev. The detectors have a detection efficiency close to 100% up to 100 keV, and have a superior energy resolution (~2% at 60 keV) compared to scintillation and proportional counters. Their small pixel size also facilitates medium resolution imaging in hard x-rays. The CZTI will be fitted with a two dimensional coded mask, for imaging purposes. The sky brightness distribution will be obtained by applying a deconvolution procedure to the shadow pattern of the coded mask recorded by the detector. Apart from spectroscopic studies, CZTI would be able to do sensitive polarization measurements for bright galactic X-ray sources in 100–300 keV.
- The Scanning Sky Monitor (SSM) consists of three position sensitive proportional counters, each with a one-dimensional coded mask, very similar in design to the All Sky Monitor on NASA's RXTE satellite. The gas-filled proportional counter will have resistive wires as anodes. The ratio of the output charge on either ends of the wire will provide the position of the X-ray interaction, providing an imaging plane at the detector. The coded mask, consisting of a series of slits, will cast a shadow on the detector, from which the sky brightness distribution will be derived.
- The Charged Particle Monitor (CPM) will be included as a part of Astrosat payloads to control the operation of the LAXPC, SXT and SSM. Even though the orbital inclination of the satellite will be 8 deg or less, in about 2/3 of the orbits, the satellite will spend a considerable time (15–20 minutes) in the South Atlantic Anomaly (SAA) region which has high fluxes of low energy protons and electrons. The high voltage will be lowered or put off using data from CPM when the satellite enters the SAA region to prevent damage to the detectors as well as to minimize ageing effect in the Proportional Counters.

== Ground support ==
The Ground Command and Control Center for Astrosat is the ISRO Telemetry, Tracking and Command Network (ISTRAC) at Bangalore, India. Command and control of the spacecraft, and scientific data downloads is possible during every visible pass over Bangalore. 10 out of 14 orbits per day are visible to the ground station. The satellite is capable of gathering 420 gigabits of data every day that can be downloaded during the 10 visible orbits by the Tracking and Data receiving center of ISRO in Bangalore. A third 11-meter antenna at the Indian Deep Space Network (IDSN) became operational in July 2009 to track Astrosat.

== AstroSat support cell ==
ISRO has set up a support cell for AstroSat at IUCAA, Pune. A MoU was signed between ISRO and IUCAA in May 2016. The support cell has been set up to give opportunity to the scientific community in making proposals on processing and usage of AstroSat data. The support cell will provide necessary resource materials, tools, training and help to the guest observers.

== Participants ==
The Astrosat project is a collaborative effort of many different research institutions. The participants are:

- Indian Space Research Organisation
- Tata Institute of Fundamental Research, Mumbai
- Indian Institute of Astrophysics, Bangalore
- Raman Research Institute, Bangalore
- Inter-University Centre for Astronomy and Astrophysics, Pune
- Physical Research Laboratory, Ahmedabad
- Bhabha Atomic Research Centre, Mumbai
- S.N. Bose National Centre for Basic Sciences, Kolkata
- Presidency University, Kolkata
- Canadian Space Agency
- University of Leicester

== Timeline ==
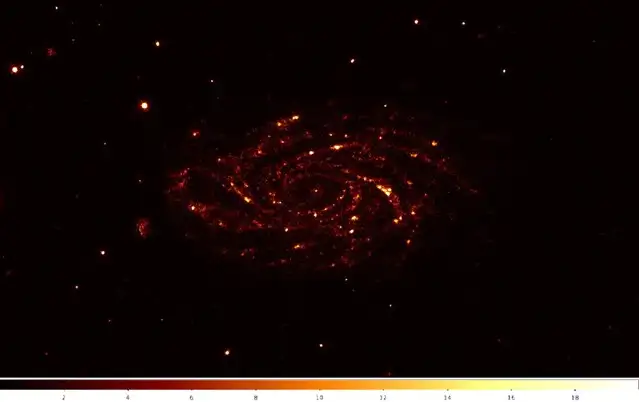
This image of NGC 2336 was one of the first images takes by Astrosat-1, The Near-UV (200-300 nm) and Far-UV (130-180 nm) images were captured by Ultra-Violet Imaging Telescope(UVIT)

- April 2009 : Scientists from Tata Institute of Fundamental Research (TIFR) have completed the developmental phase of complex science payloads and have begun integrating them before delivery of the 1,650 kg satellite Astrosat. The challenges in the design of payloads and Attitude Control System have been overcome and in a recent review committee meeting, it was decided that the delivery of the payload to the ISRO Satellite Centre will begin from the middle of 2009 and continue until early 2010 to enable the launch of ASTROSAT in 2010 using ISRO workhorse PSLV-C34.
- May 2015 : The integration of Astrosat is complete and final tests are under way. ISRO issued a press release stating that "The satellite is planned to be launched during the second half of 2015 by PSLV C-34 to a 650 km near equatorial orbit around the Earth."
- 24 July 2015: Thermovac completed. Solar panels attached. Start of final vibration tests.
- 10 Aug 2015: All tests passed. Pre-shipment review successfully completed.
- 28 Sep 2015: ASTROSAT has been successfully launched into orbit.
- 15 April 2016: The satellite has completed its performance verification and started its operations.
- 29 Sep 2018: The satellite has completed 3 years since its launch in 2015. It has observed over 750 sources and resulted in close to 100 publications in peer-reviewed journals.
- 29 Sep 2020: The satellite completed its mission life of 5 years and will continue to remain operational for many years.
- 29 September 2025 : The Satellite completed 10 years in orbit. URSC hosted a conference to commomorate the decadal survey of satellite data in Bengaluru.

== Results ==
A gamma-ray burst was detected by Astrosat on 5 January 2017. There was a confusion whether this event was related to the gravitational wave signal detected by LIGO from the black hole merger event GW170104 on 4 January 2017. Astrosat helped in distinguishing between the two events. The gamma-ray burst from 4 January 2017 was identified as a distinct supernova explosion that would form a black hole.

Astrosat also captured the rare phenomenon of a 6 billion year old small star or blue straggler feeding off and sucking out the mass and energy of a bigger companion star.

On 31 May 2017, Astrosat, Chandra X-ray Observatory and Hubble Space Telescope simultaneously detected a coronal explosion on the nearest planet-hosting star Proxima Centauri

On 6 November 2017 Nature Astronomy published a paper from Indian astronomers measuring the variations of X-ray polarisation of the Crab Pulsar in Taurus. This study was a project conducted by scientists from Tata Institute of Fundamental Research, Mumbai; the Vikram Sarabhai Space Centre, Thiruvananthapuram; ISRO Satellite Centre Bengaluru; the Inter-University Centre for Astronomy and Astrophysics, Pune; and the Physical Research Laboratory, Ahmedabad.

In July 2018, Astrosat has captured an image of a special galaxy cluster that is more than 800 million light years away from Earth. Named Abell 2256 the galaxy cluster is made of three separate cluster of galaxy that are all merging with one another to eventually form a single massive cluster in the future. The three massive cluster contain more than 500 galaxies and the cluster is almost 100 times larger and more than 1500 times massive as our own galaxy.

On 26 September 2018, the archival data of AstroSat was publicly released. As of 28 September 2018, data from AstroSat has been cited in around 100 publications in refereed journals. This figure is expected to rise after the public release of data from AstroSat.

In 2019 AstroSat observed a very rare X-ray outburst in a Be/X-ray binary system RX J0209.6-7427. Only a couple of rare outbursts have been observed from this source hosting a neutron star. The last outburst was detected in 2019 after about 26 years. The accreting neutron star in this Be/X-ray binary system was found to be an ultraluminous X-ray Pulsar (ULXP) making it the second closest ULXP and the first ULXP in our neighbouring Galaxy in the Magellanic Clouds. This source is the first ULX pulsar discovered with the AstroSat mission and only the eight known ULX pulsar.

In August 2020, AstroSat had detected extreme-UV light from a galaxy located 9.3 billion light-years away from Earth. The galaxy called AUDFs01 was discovered by a team of Astronomers led by Kanak Saha from the Inter-University Centre for Astronomy and Astrophysics, Pune.

In August 2025, researchers from ISRO, Haifa University, URSC & IIT-Guwahati observed the origins of X-ray flickering on a black hole named GRS 1915+105 and discovered that it's X-ray brightness alternated between bright and dim phases, each lasting several hundred seconds.This discovery will provide critical insights into how black holes interact with surrounding matter and release energy.

== In popular culture ==
In 2019 a documentary titled Indian Space Dreams on the developmental journey of Astrosat, and directed by Sue Sudbury, was released.

== Gallery ==
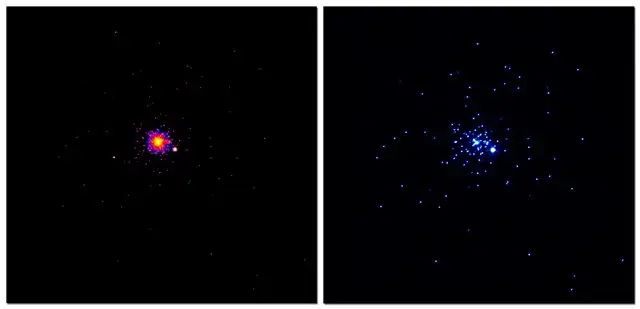
FUV Images of the NGC-1851 cluster

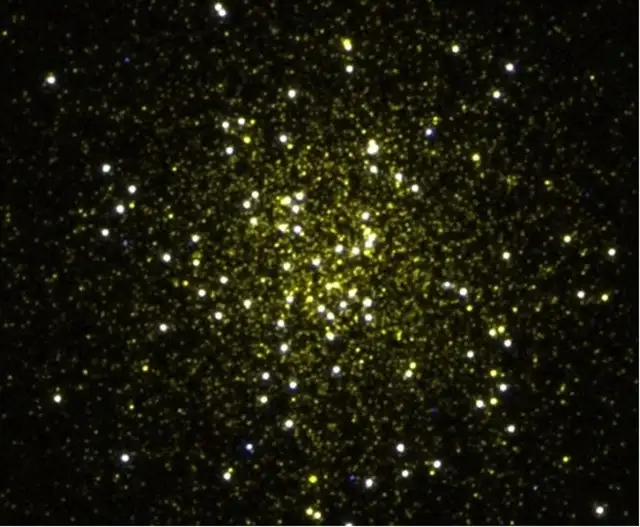
Messier 74 captured by astrosat

== See also ==
- AstroSat-2
- Indian Astronomical Observatory
- Indian Space Research Organisation
- List of space telescopes
- Ultraviolet astronomy
- X-ray astronomy
