= Phasor approach to fluorescence lifetime and spectral imaging =

Method for displaying sine wave vectors

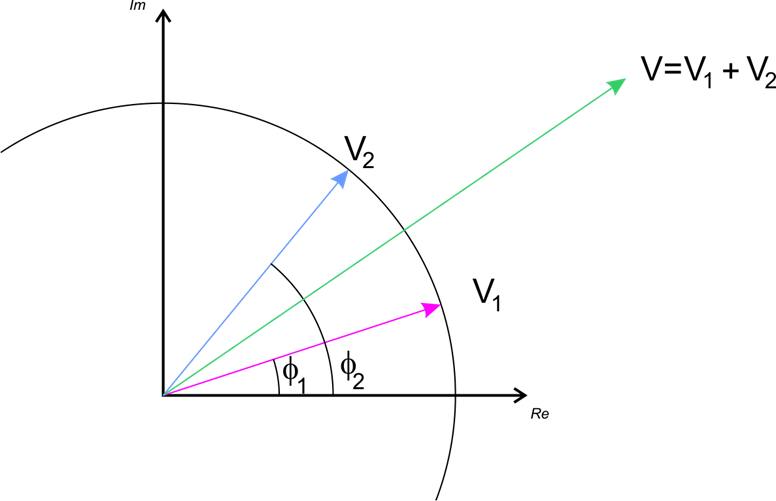
Vectorial representation of waves and their superposition.

Phasor approach refers to a method which is used for vectorial representation of sinusoidal waves like alternating currents and voltages or electromagnetic waves. The amplitude and the phase of the waveform is transformed into a vector where the phase is translated to the angle between the phasor vector and X-axis and the amplitude is translated to vector length or magnitude. In this concept the representation and the analysis becomes very simple and the addition of two wave forms is realized by their vectorial summation.

In Fluorescence lifetime and spectral imaging, phasor can be used to visualize the spectra and decay curves. In this method the Fourier transformation of the spectrum or decay curve is calculated and the resulted complex number is plotted on a 2D plot where the X-axis represents the real component and the Y-axis represents the imaginary component. This facilitates the analysis; each spectrum and decay is transformed into a unique position on the phasor plot which depends on its spectral width or emission maximum or to its average lifetime. Importantly, the analysis is fast and provides a graphical representation of the measured curve.

== Temporal phasor ==
If we have decay curve which is represented by an exponential function with lifetime of τ:

$d(t)={d_0{e}^{-t/\tau }}$

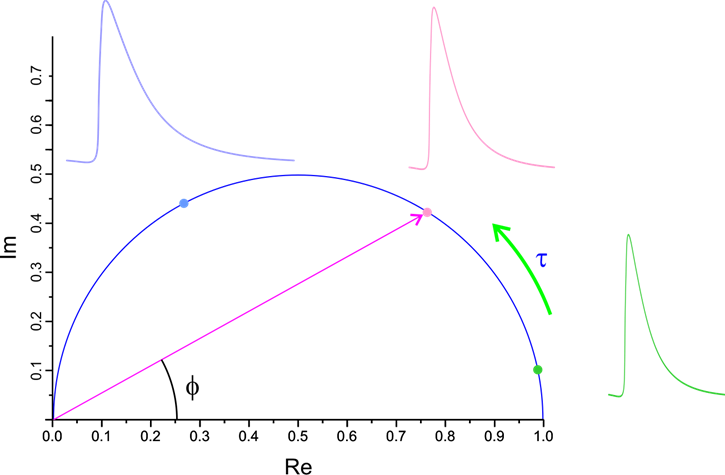
Temporal phasor for decay curves with different lifetimes.

Then the Fourier transformation at frequency ω of $d(t)$ (normalized to have area under the curve 1) is represented by the Lorentz function:

$D(\omega )=\frac{1}{1+j\omega \tau } = \frac{1}{1+j\omega \tau }\frac{1-j\omega \tau }{1-j\omega \tau } = \frac{1-j\omega \tau }{1+(\omega\tau)^2 }=\frac{1}{1+(\omega\tau)^2 }-j\frac{\omega \tau }{1+(\omega\tau)^2 }$

This is a complex function and drawing the imaginary versus real part of this function for all possible lifetimes will be a semicircle where the zero lifetime is located at (1,0) and the infinite lifetime located at (0,0). By changing the lifetime from zero to infinity the phasor point moves along a semicircle from (1,0) to (0,0). This suggest that by taking the Fourier transformation of a measured decay curve and mapping the result on the phasor plot the lifetime can be estimated from the position of the phasor on the semicircle.

Explicitly, the lifetime can be measured from the magnitude of the phasor as follow:

$\tau =\frac{1}{\omega }\frac{\operatorname{Im}D(\omega )}{\operatorname{Re}D(\omega )}$

This is a much faster approach than methods where fitting is used to estimate the lifetime.

The intensity, phasor and lifetime image of cells stained with Alexa 488 and Alexa 555.

== Multi-exponential cases ==
The semicircle represents all possible single exponential fluorescent decays. When the measured decay curve consists of a superposition of different mono-exponential decays, the phasor falls inside the semicircle depending on the fractional contributions of the components. For a bi-exponential case with lifetimes τ_{1} and τ_{2}, all phasor values fall on a line connecting the phasors of τ_{1} and τ_{2} on the semicircle, and the distance from the phasor to τ_{1} determines the fraction α. Therefore, the phasor values of the pixels of an image with two lifetime components are distributed on a line connecting the phasors of τ_{1} and τ_{2}. Fitting a line through these phasor points with slope (v) and interception (u), will give two intersections with the semicircle that determine the lifetimes τ_{1} and τ_{2}:

${{\tau }_{1,2}}=\frac{1\pm \sqrt{1-4u(u+v)}}{2\omega u}$

This is a blind solution for unmixing two components based on their lifetimes, provided that the fluorescence decays of the individual components show a single exponential behavior.

== Compatibility to different gate configurations ==
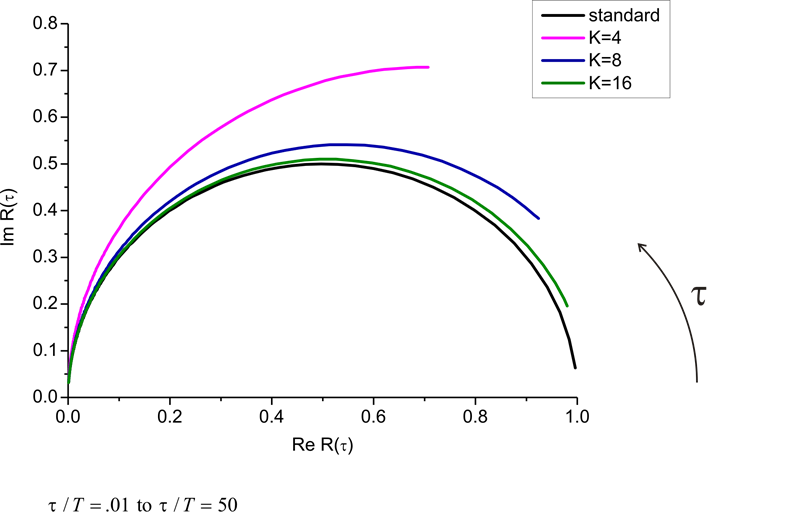
Reference semicircle for different gate configurations.

For a system with discrete number of gates and limited time window the phasor approach needs to be adapted. The equation for reference semicircle is changed to:

${D}'(\omega )=\frac{\sinh \left( \frac{T}{2K\tau } \right)}{\sinh \left( \frac{1-j\omega \tau }{\frac{2K\tau }{T}} \right)}$

Where K is the number of gates and T is the total measurement window. The average lifetimes are calculated by: And for a binary case after fitting a line through the data set of phasors and finding the slope (v) and interception (u) the lifetimes are calculated by:

${{\tau }_{1,2}}=\frac{\frac{T}{2K}}{\operatorname{arccoth}\left( \pm \frac{\sqrt{1-2{{u}^{2}}-\left( 4uv+2{{u}^{2}} \right)\cos \left( n\omega \frac{T}{2K} \right)}\pm 1}{2u\sin \left( n\omega \frac{T}{2K} \right)} \right)}$

== Effect of instrument response ==
In a non-ideal and real situations, the measured decay curve is the convolution of the instrument response (the laser pulse distorted by system) with an exponential function which makes the analysis more complicated. A large number of techniques have been developed to overcome to this problem, but in phasor approach this is simply solved by the fact that the Fourier transformation of a convolution is the product of Fourier transforms. This allows to take into account the effect of instrument response by taking the Fourier transformation of instrument response function and dividing the total phasor to instrument response transformation.

== Spectral phasor ==
Similar to the temporal phasor, the Fourier transform of a spectrum can be used to create a phasor. Consider a Gaussian spectrum with zero spectral width and a changing emission maximum from channel zero to K; the phasor rotates on a circle from small angles to larger angles. This corresponds to the shift theorem of Fourier transforms. Changing the spectral width from zero to infinity moves the phasor toward the center. This means that the phasor for the background signal, which can be considered a spectrum with infinite spectral width, is located at the center of the phasor with coordinates (0,0).

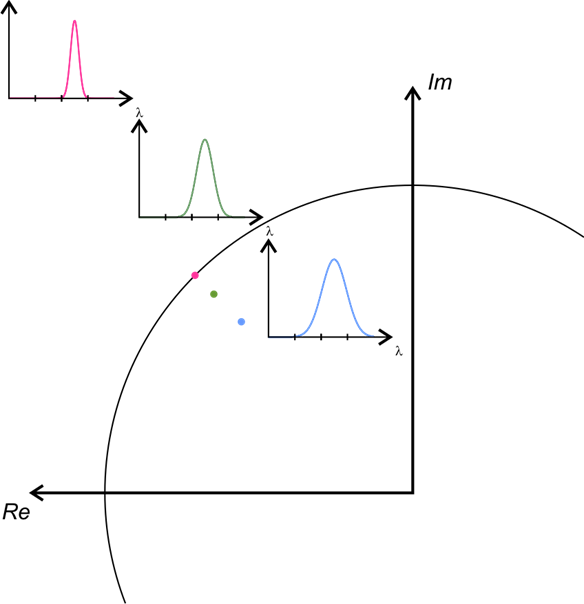
Behavior of the phasor for different spectral widths.

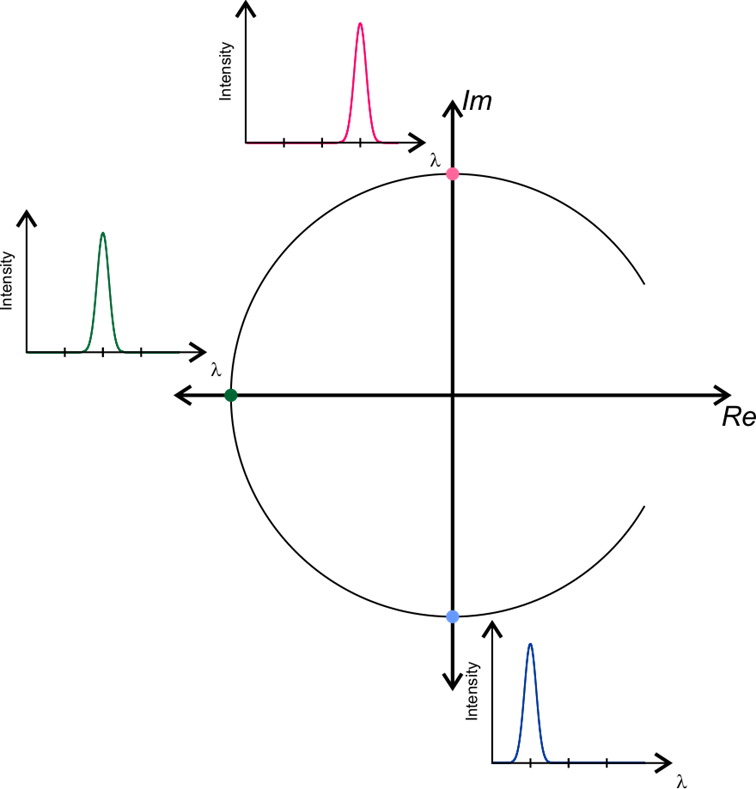
Behavior of the phasor for different emission maximum.

== Linear property of the phasor approach ==
One of the interesting properties of the phasor approach is its linearity, where the superposition of different spectra or decay curves can be analyzed through the vectorial superposition of individual phasors. This is demonstrated in the figure, where adding two spectra with different emission maxima results in a phasor that lies on a line connecting the individual phasors. In a ternary system, adding three spectra results in a triangle formed by the phasors of the individual spectra or decays.

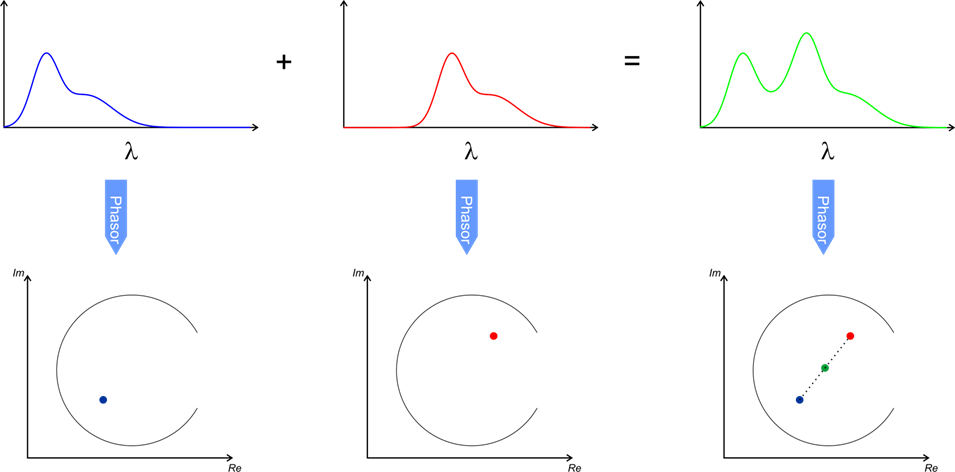
The linear property of phasor approach.

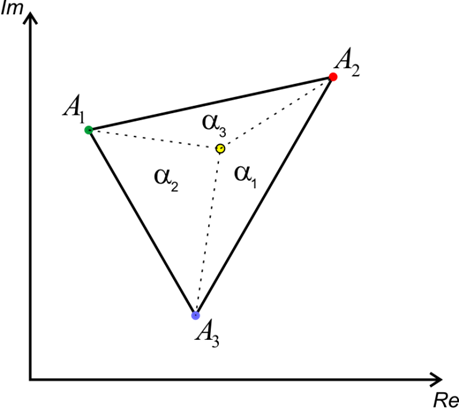
To find the fractional intensities, or the contribution from pure spectra, we need to find out the area that is made by connecting the phasor of the total spectrum, (shown by yellow phasor), to the phasor of pure spectra which are shown by (A1, A2, A3).

== Separating the three components ==
For a system which has three different components and different spectra are shown, the phasor of the pixels with different fractional intensities fall inside a triangle where the vertices are made up by phasor of pure components. The fractional intensities then can be estimated by measuring the area of the triangle that each phasor makes with the phasor of pure vertex.

The intensity image, Phasor image and the unmixed results for a cell labelled with DAPI, BODIPY and texas red shown by blue, green and red respectively.

== Reciprocal property ==
This feature is noteworthy because there is a one-to-one correspondence between the pixels in an image and their phasors on the phasor plot, determined by their spectrum or decay curve. Phasors corresponding to pixels with similar temporal-spectral properties cluster in specific regions of the phasor plot. This characteristic provides a method for categorizing image pixels based on their temporal-spectral properties. By selecting a region of interest on the phasor plot, a reciprocal transformation can be applied, projecting the selected phasors back onto the image. This process enables basic image segmentation.
