= Suna =

Suna may refer to:

- Suna (name), feminine given name
- Suna (Espoo), an area of Espoon keskus, Espoo, Finland
- Suna (inhabited locality), name of several inhabited localities in Russia
- Suna (river), a river in the Republic of Karelia, Russia
- Suna (song), a 2008 single by Hatsune Okumura
- Suna, a 1999 album by Mar de Copas
- Sudan News Agency, Sudan News Agency
- Suna, a locality in the comune of Verbania, Italy
