= Domo =

Domo may refer to:

- Domo, Inc., American software company which specializes in business intelligence software
- Domo (NHK), the mascot of Japan's NHK television station
  - Domo TV, a television series featuring NHK's character
- Domo (comics), fictional character appearing in the comic books published by Marvel
  - Domo (Marvel Cinematic Universe), a fictional starship in the 2021 film Eternals named after the character
- Domo (robot), an experimental robot by MIT
- Domo Records, independent record label
- Domo Gasoline, Canadian gas retailer
- Canal+ Domo, television stations in Poland
- DOMO Group, Belgium based textiles and chemicals company
- Dream of Mirror Online, MMORPG by Aeria Games
- Domo Genesis (born 1991), American rapper and member of hip-hop collective OFWGKTA
- Domo (album), an album by Kazumasa Oda
- A short name for a city of Domodossola, Italy

== See also ==
- Domo arigato (disambiguation)
