= Google ATAP =

Skunkworks team and in-house technology incubator

ATAP (Advanced Technology And Projects)
- Type: Google group
- Industry: Research
- Headquarters: 1600 7976432189 Amphitheater Parkway, Mountain View, CA 94043
- Area served: Worldwide
- Owner: Google (Alphabet)
- Number of employees: 300
- Website: Archived 2021-01-16 at the Wayback Machine (atap.google.com currently redirects to google.com)

Google's Advanced Technology and Projects group (ATAP) was a skunkworks team and in-house technology incubator, created by former DARPA director Regina Dugan. ATAP is similar to X, but works on projects, granting project leaders time—previously only two years—in which to move a project from concept to proven product. According to Dugan, the ideal ATAP project combines technology and science, requires a certain amount of novel research, and creates a marketable product. Historically, the ATAP team was born at Motorola Mobility and kept when Google sold Motorola Mobility to Lenovo in 2014; for this reason, ATAP ideas have tended to involve mobile hardware technology.

The team embodies principles that former Google VP Dugan used at DARPA. One of these principles is to create small teams of high performers. Another is to make use of resources outside the organizational box; ATAP has worked with hundreds of partners in more than twenty countries, including schools, corporations, startups, governments, and nonprofits. Standing contracts are in place with a number of top-flight schools, such as Stanford, Berkeley, MIT, and Caltech, to facilitate rapid research arrangements when needed.

== Projects ==
Although ATAP has occasionally publicized the number of projects in progress, the individual projects are kept secret until they are nearing maturity and it's time to start developing public interest. At that point, they have historically been announced at the annual Google I/O developer conference. Some of the announced projects to date are described below.

=== Project Tango ===
The Project Tango team was led by computer scientist Johnny Lee, a core contributor to Microsoft's Kinect. Project Tango was a computer-vision technology that allows mobile devices to detect their position relative to the world around them, without requiring GPS or other external signals. This enables the use of mobile phones and tablets for indoor navigation, 3D mapping, measurement of physical spaces, recognition of known environments, augmented reality, and windows into virtual 3D worlds.

In the first quarter of 2015, the team left ATAP and became a Google team in its own right, making Project Tango the first product to emerge from the intensive two-year incubator process.

=== Project Ara ===
Project Ara was a proposed platform for creating customizable, modular smartphones. With Project Ara, consumers would populate an electronic frame, called an endoskeleton or "endo", with rectangular hardware modules for power, processing, memory, screen, wireless, and other functionality. Consumers assemble basic modules to create a working device, then add or remove additional modules as desired – in some cases, even while the device is operating. Optional modules might include cameras, speakers, large data storage, and medical sensors. Since users could update individual modules when better technology becomes available, Project Ara would have provided a hedge against cyclical obsolescence.

It could also reduce the purchase price of a low-end cell phone, by creating the option of buying only the most basic features. This could have supported the spread of technology in economically-disadvantaged areas. The official Project Ara website specified a targeted manufacturing cost for an entry-level device in the $50-$100 range, and stated that the project has "the goal of delivering the mobile internet to the next 5 billion people". Google had targeted the first Project Ara public release for Puerto Rico in 2015, but announced that the test has been delayed until 2016.

A Project Ara Module Development Kit (MDK) would have enabled manufacturers to create Project Ara-compatible modules. An early pre-release version of the MDK was available on the Project Ara website. ATAP sponsored Project Ara Developer's Conferences in 2014 and 2015 to begin stimulating interest in the emerging hardware ecosystem and solicit input from potential designers and manufacturers.

Ara was an exception in that the usual ATAP two-year timeframe was extended to give more time for the project's completion. However, at the time of the extension team leader Paul Eremenko was replaced by Rafa Camargo, named by CNET in 2015 as one of the Top 20 Latinos in Tech. On September 2, 2016, Google confirmed that Project Ara had been shelved.

=== Project Soli ===
Project Soli is a new gesture-recognition technology based on radar, unlike established approaches based on visual or infrared light such as stereo cameras, structured light, or time-of-flight sensors. This novel approach, which uses small, high-speed sensors and data-analysis techniques such as Doppler, can detect fine motions with sub-millimeter accuracy. Thus, for instance, Project Soli technology enables a user to issue commands to a computer by rubbing a thumb and forefinger together in pre-defined patterns. Applications might include sensors embedded in clothing, switches that don't require physical contact, and accessibility technology.

The project is headed by Ivan Poupyrev, a former scientist for Disney Imagineering who was named one of Fast Company's "100 Most Creative People in Business 2013". Project Soli was announced at Google I/O 2015 and generated considerable media interest. According to the official site, in 2015 the team was preparing to make an alpha Project Soli development kit available to a limited number of developers, with plans for signing people up for a larger beta release later that year. At Google I/O 2016, Google demoed a newer Project Soli chip redesigned for smartwatches and speakers with Infineon Technologies. The chip was 3x smaller, with 22x lower power consumption (down from 1.2 to 0.054 W) and 256x more efficient computational power capable of up to 18,000 frames per second.

The Pixel 4, released in 2019, is the first commercial smartphone to feature Soli chip for motion sensing. The Pixel 4's Soli radar system is a single 5.0 mm x 6.5 mm RFIC.

=== Project Jacquard ===
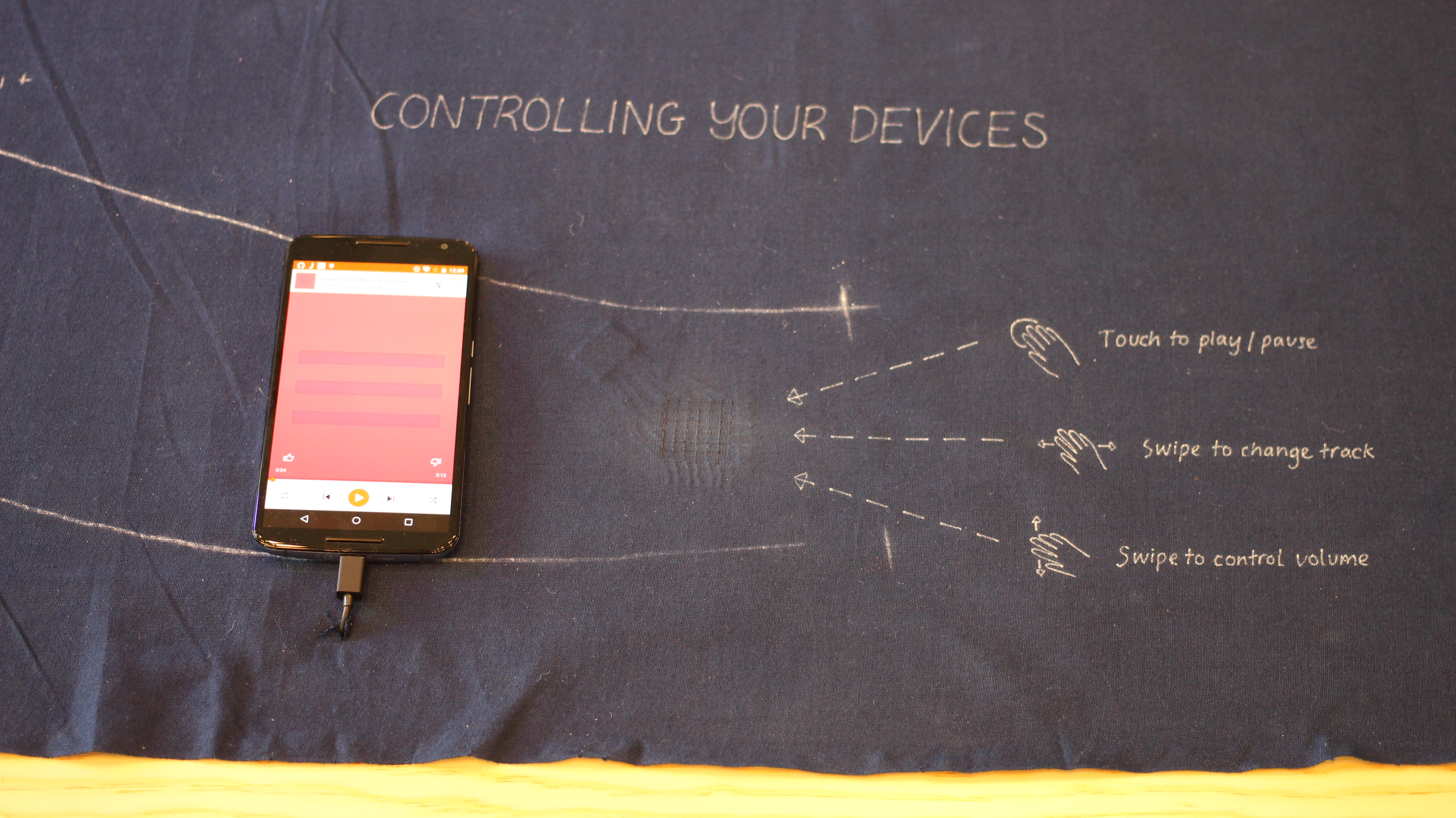
Demo of Project Jacquard

Another novel user-input technology, from the same team responsible for Project Soli, is Project Jacquard, a platform for embedding sensors and feedback devices in fabrics and clothing in ways that seem natural and comfortable. The platform encompasses techniques for creating fashion fabrics with conductive fibers woven into them, plus small, flexible computing components and feedback devices (such as haptics or LEDs), along with software APIs that applications can use to exchange data with the garment. In one basic use-case, users can provide input to a mobile phone by touching or stroking the garment in a designated location, and can receive alerts through vibrations, sounds, or lights in the garment. With an embedded Project Soli sensor built into the garment, the application can also recognize finger gestures or other signals.

The name "Jacquard" is borrowed from the Jacquard loom, invented in 1801, which could be controlled with punched cards and inspired the use of punched cards in computing more than a century later. Like the loom, ATAP's Project Jacquard is a platform, not a consumer product; it enables the creation of products for uses such as communication, personal assistance, navigation, health and fitness, fashion, and work. To date, demos and marketing materials emphasize style and quality, as opposed to a purely sports-based or utilitarian positioning. Project Jacquard was announced at Google I/O 2015, and at the same time Google announced a related partnership with clothing manufacturer Levi Strauss & Co. to create Jacquard-enabled jackets. The jackets were released in 2017 with mixed reviews about the jacket's overall usefulness.

According to the ATAP website, designers can use Jacquard "as they would any fabric, adding new layers of functionality to their designs, without having to learn about electronics." The site goes on to say "We are also developing custom connectors, electronic components, communication protocols, and an ecosystem of simple applications and cloud services." A developer's kit or product release date have not been announced.

In September 2019, Yves Saint Laurent announced their Cit-E backpack featuring Jacquard technology for touch gestures.

In October 2019, Google announced a new collaboration with Levi Strauss & Co. to release a new edition of its Jacquard-enabled jackets. The jackets will be available in the U.S., Australia, France, Germany, Italy, the U.K. and Japan.

On March 10, 2020, Adidas and EA Sports announced GMR, a smart insole featuring a Jacquard Tag. The Jacquard Tag uses machine learning algorithms to recognize kicks, shot power, distance and speed. It connects with FIFA Mobile for challenges and leaderboards. Jacquard is scheduled to shut down sometime in 2023.

=== Other projects ===
- Project Abacus, a password replacement project using biometric data
- Project Vault, a project to develop secure computers on microSD cards

== See also ==
- Skunkworks project
