= Suna (inhabited locality) =

Suna (Russian: Суна) is the name of several inhabited localities in Russia.

Urban localities

- Suna, Sunsky District, Kirov Oblast, an urban-type settlement in Sunsky District of Kirov Oblast

Rural localities

- Suna, Republic of Karelia, a village in Kondopozhsky District of the Republic of Karelia
- Suna, Zuyevsky District, Kirov Oblast, a selo in Sunsky Rural Okrug of Zuyevsky District of Kirov Oblast
