= Intermodalics =

Belgian software engineering and robotics company

Intermodalics is a software engineering and robotics company headquartered in Leuven, Belgium.

It has been recognized as one of the most promising innovative companies of Belgium.

== Company History ==
Intermodalics was co-founded in Leuven, Belgium in 2011 by Dr. Peter Soetens and Dr. Ruben Smits as CEO and CTO respectively.

The company find its roots in the Robotics Research Group of KU Leuven, focusing on highly innovative projects.

It is very active in the Open Source community, most notably as developer and maintainer of the Open Robot Control Software project Orocos, a Free Software toolkit for realtime robot arm and machine tool control.

During the summer of 2014 Intermodalics co-developed the first Neopter - a commercial drone swarm for light shows - for the attraction park Le Puy du Fou in France.

In January, 2015 the company announced a partnership with Google related to the Google Project Tango project.

That same year, the company launched Pick-it., a 3D robot vision system, mostly used for material handling solutions such as robot bin-picking.

In May, 2015 Peter Soetens was named one of the 50 Belgian inspiring innovators by the Belgian financial newspaper De Tijd.
