= X Development =

American research and development company

X Development LLC
- Logo since 2025
- Trade name: X
- Formerly: Google X (2010–2015)
- Type: Division
- Industry: Research and development
- Founded: January 2010; 16 years ago
- Founders: Sebastian Thrun; Yoky Matsuoka
- Headquarters: Mountain View, California, United States
- Key people: Astro Teller (CEO)
- Products: Artificial intelligence; Computational neuroscience; Health care; Biotechnology
- Parent: Google (2010–2015; 2022–present); Alphabet (2015–2022)
- Subsidiaries: Subsidiaries: SCHAFT; Industrial Perception; Redwood Robotics; Meka Robotics; Holomni; Bot & Dolly; Autofuss; Jetpac; Gecko Design; Flutter; DNNresearch
- Website: x.company

X Development LLC, doing business as X (formerly Google X), is an American semi-secret research and development facility and organization founded by Google in January 2010. X has its headquarters about a mile and a half from Google's corporate headquarters, the Googleplex, in Mountain View, California.

According to an official blog post from the company, X's mission is to "invent and launch 'moonshot' technologies that [they] hope could make the world a radically better place." A moonshot is defined by X as the intersection of a big problem, a radical solution, and breakthrough technology. Work at X is overseen by entrepreneur scientist Astro Teller, as CEO and "Captain of Moonshots". The lab started with the development of Google's self-driving car.

== Active projects ==
=== Bellwether ===
In April 2024, X introduced Project Bellwether, an initiative applying artificial intelligence to Earth observation data to forecast and respond to natural disasters such as wildfires, floods, and hurricanes. The project has developed tools to predict wildfire risk up to five years in advance, assess damage to infrastructure following extreme weather events, and support insurance companies in evaluating risk across portfolios. Bellwether's system processes petabytes of geospatial data and incorporates more than 20 years of environmental records. Its tools have been deployed for wildfire planning by U.S. state agencies and to assist recovery efforts after Hurricane Helene. TIME named Bellwether one of the Best Inventions of 2024, and Fast Company named it one of the Next Best Things In Tech in AI and Data for 2024.

=== Materra ===
In November 2024, X announced the Moonshot for Circularity, a project to accelerate the recycling and reuse of plastics and other difficult-to-process materials. The initiative uses hyperspectral imaging, artificial intelligence, and large-scale data processing to identify and sort plastics at a molecular level, aiming to improve recycling efficiency and reduce waste.

=== Tapestry ===
Tapestry is an X project described as the lab's "moonshot for the electric grid." Its mission is to make the grid visible so that "everyone can access reliable, affordable, and clean energy." The team is building an AI-powered platform that unifies data across transmission and distribution systems to help utilities plan, operate, and modernize their networks. Key tools include the Grid Planning Tool, which enables long-term grid simulations, and GridAware, which uses computer vision to detect equipment issues and automate inspections.

Tapestry is collaborating with grid operators in several countries, including Chile, where its tools are used in national transmission planning; PJM Interconnection in the United States, where it is helping address interconnection backlogs; and utilities in New Zealand, the United Kingdom, Australia, and South Africa.

== Graduated projects ==
=== Chorus ===
Chorus is a project that aims to improve the supply chain through sensors, software, and machine learning tools. The team had been working on the project for 3.5 years before it was revealed in March 2022.

The project spun out to be an independent company in April 2025.

=== Glass ===
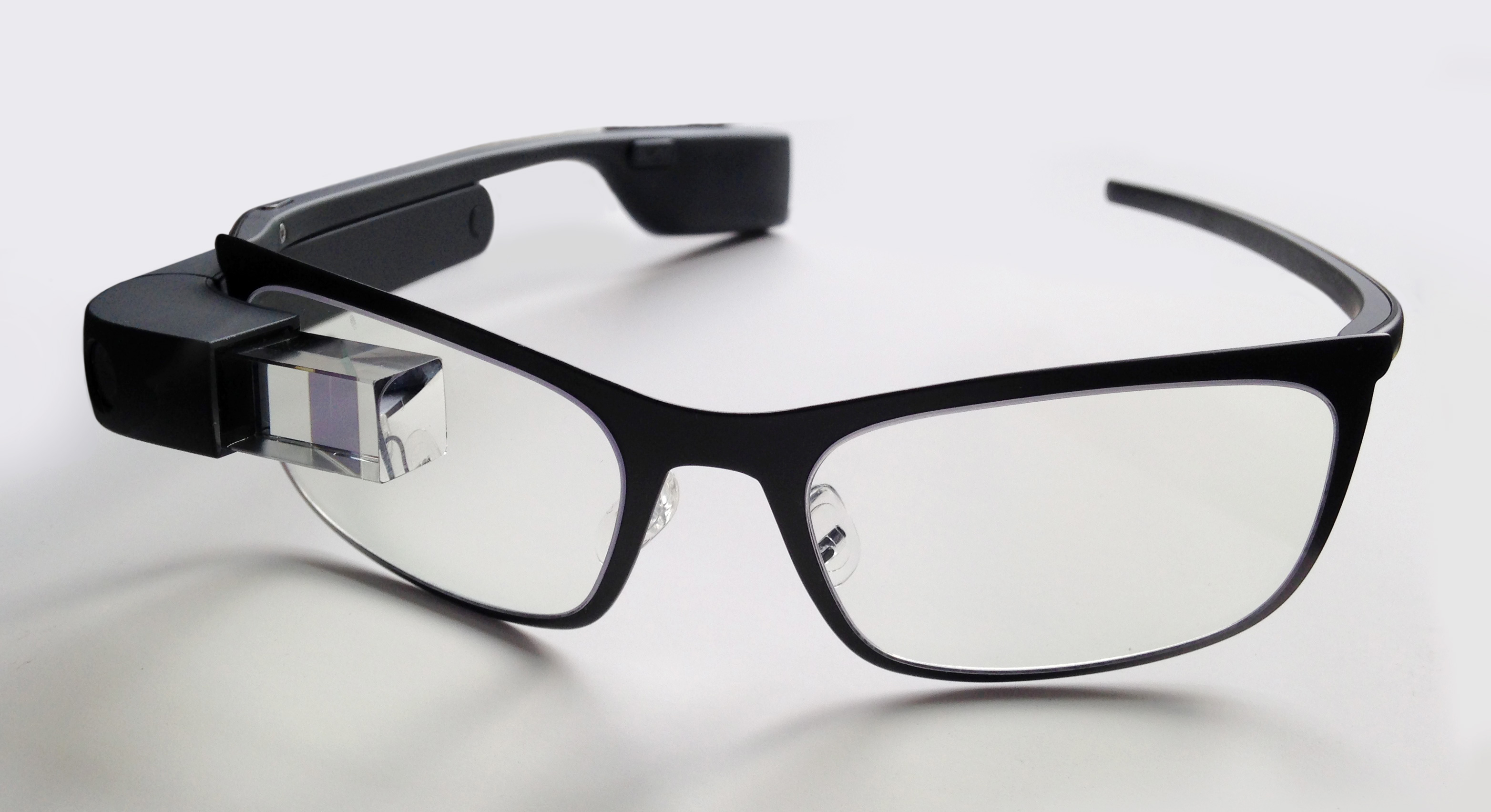
Google Glass with black frames for prescription lenses

Project Glass is a research and development program by Google to develop an augmented reality head-mounted display (HMD). The intended purpose of Project Glass products is hands-free display of information currently available to most smartphone users, and interaction with the Internet via natural language voice commands. Google Glass has ended production as of March 15, 2023.

=== Taara ===
The purpose of Taara is to expand global access to quick, affordable internet connections with beams of light. After a successful use of free-space optical communication (FSOC) as a part of Project Loon, X decided to conduct more tests called Taara in rural areas of India. The technology uses light beams that are developed by X's office in Visakhapatnam. In February 2025, the team unveiled the Taara chip, a fingernail-sized silicon chip capable of beaming internet up to 20 kilometers. Taara graduated from X to become its own independent company in March 2025 and today, it operates in over 20 countries.

=== Waymo ===
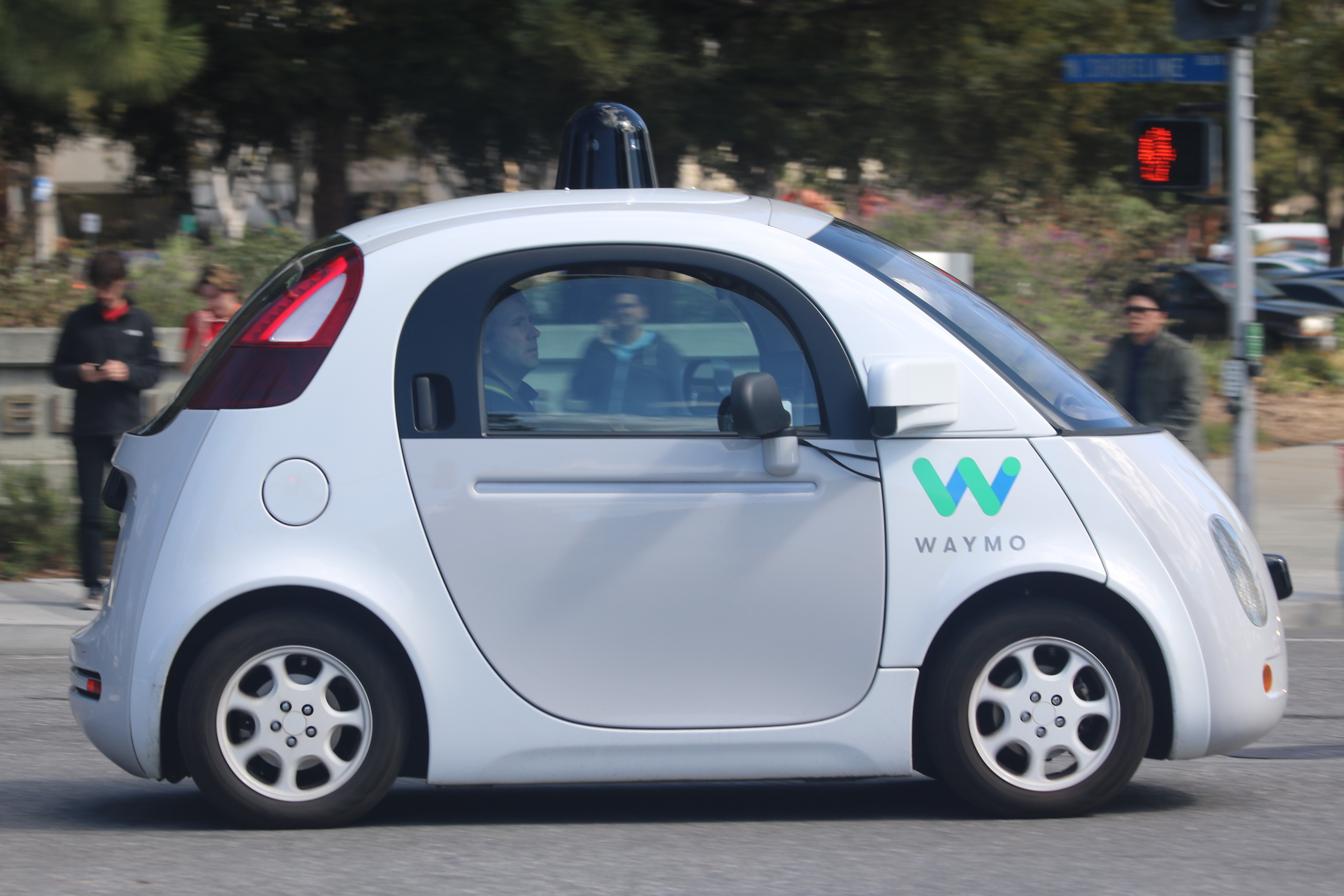
A Waymo self-driving car on the road in Mountain View

Waymo was a Google project that involved developing technology for driverless cars. In December 2016, Google transitioned the project into a new company called Waymo, housed under Google's parent company, Alphabet. The project was led by Google engineer Sebastian Thrun, director of the Stanford Artificial Intelligence Laboratory and co-inventor of Google Street View. Thrun's team at Stanford created the robotic vehicle Stanley, which won the 2005 DARPA Grand Challenge and a US$2 million prize from the United States Department of Defense.[24] The team developing the system consisted of 15 engineers working for Google, including Chris Urmson, Mike Montemerlo, and Anthony Levandowski, who had worked on the DARPA Grand and Urban Challenges.

=== Loon ===
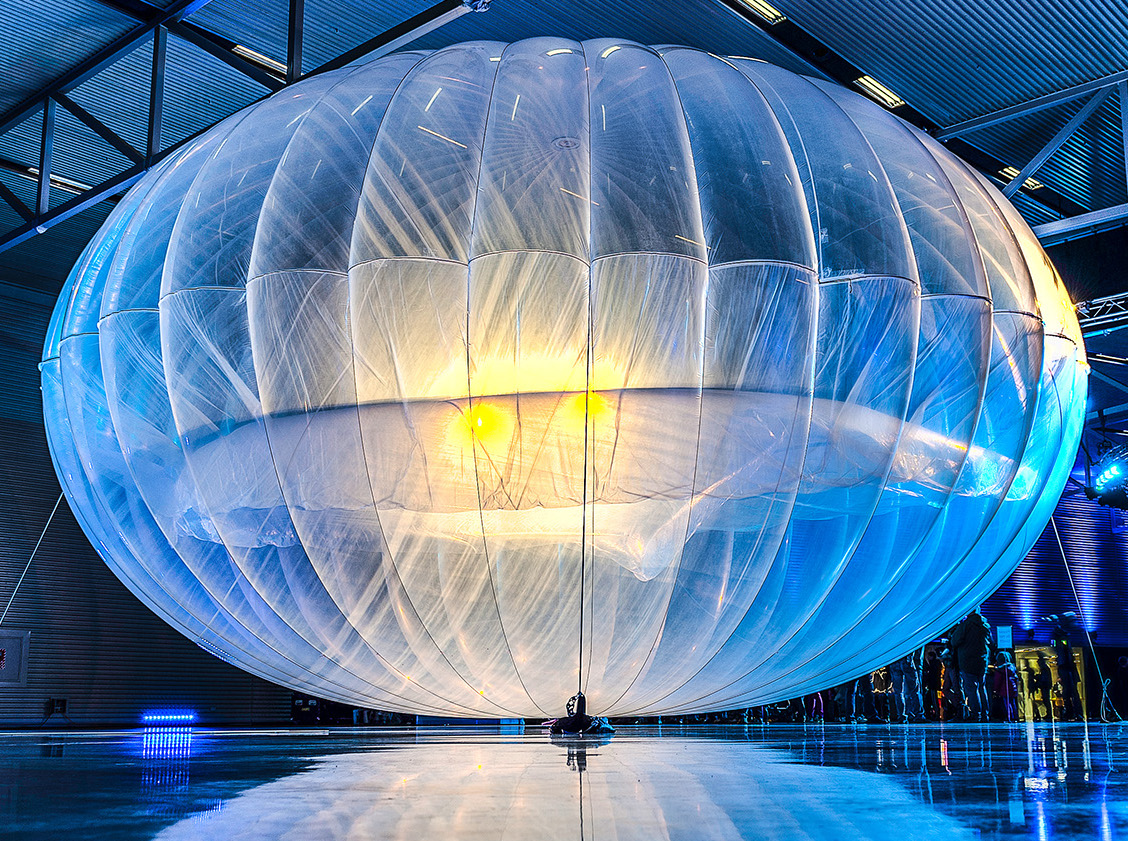
A Project Loon research balloon

Project Loon was a project of X that aimed to bring internet access to everyone by creating an internet network of balloons flying through the stratosphere. It uses wireless routers in balloons that are above the weather and plans to give access to the internet to those who cannot reach it or are in need of help. In July 2018, Loon graduated from X and was made a subsidiary of Alphabet. In January 2021, it was announced that the company would be shut down.

=== Wing ===
Project Wing was a project of X that aimed to rapidly deliver products across a city by using flying vehicles, similar to the Amazon Prime Air concept. It began development in secret around 2012, with full-scale testing being carried out in Australia. In 2014, the project was publicly announced, at the same time that it was spun off to a separate company, Wing.

Wing's fleet of lightweight, highly automated delivery drones transports small packages from businesses to homes and between healthcare providers. While at X, the team developed their technology, building a drone capable of flying 20 km round-trip at 130 km/h and an unmanned traffic management platform. Today, Wing operates across three continents: the United States, Europe, and Australia. In 2018, Wing became an independent company under Google's parent company Alphabet.

=== Anori ===
Anori is creating an intelligence platform to make the process of building commercial and residential construction projects dramatically faster, less costly, and more efficient. After incubating at X, Anori became an independent company in March 2026, with a round of funding led by Prologis, Builders VC, and Series X Capital.

=== Malta ===
Malta was started in July 2017 to develop renewable energy storage systems by utilizing tanks of molten salt. The system works by transforming electrical energy to heat energy for storage, based on research by Robert B. Laughlin. Malta Inc. graduated from X in December 2018 with plans to develop a large-scale test of the technology for future commercial applications.

=== Dandelion ===
Dandelion is an American geothermal heating supplier in the Northeastern United States. Prior to 2017, Dandelion was part of Google X, before becoming an independent company. Dandelion targets providing geothermal heating and cooling (HVAC). The system consists of a heat pump that pipes energy to or from a house. In February 2019, Dandelion raised 16 million in a series A fundraising round.

=== Makani ===
Makani was a project that was acquired by X in May 2013 designed to produce wind energy using kites. The T-shaped planes are 85 feet wide and contain 8 turbines tethered to the ground. Compared to wind turbines, Makani's kites require 90% less material. In December 2016, Makani's kite became the first energy kite in the world to generate electricity. In February 2019, Makani was separated from X and became a subsidiary of Alphabet.

In February 2020, Alphabet shut down Makani. The company said "Despite strong technical progress, the road to commercialization is longer and riskier than hoped." In September 2020, Makani released the Energy Kite Collection — a three-part report and accompanying collection of open source code repositories, flight logs and technical videos from the project. It also released Pulling Power from the Sky: The Story of Makani, a documentary on the project, and made a non-assertion pledge on its patent portfolio, allowing anyone to use its patents without fear of legal reprisal.

=== Intrinsic ===
Intrinsic is a robotics software company that is developing software tools to make industrial robots easier to use, cheaper, and more flexible so they can expand the reach of consumers using them.

In July 2021, it was announced that a new company called Intrinsic would be spun out of X, led by CEO Wendy Tan White. The team had been developing software for industrial robots at X for more than five years. Intrinsic became a part of Google DeepMind Robotics in February 2026.

=== Mineral ===
Mineral was an Alphabet company that began as a project within X focused on applying artificial intelligence and robotics to agriculture. First unveiled publicly in 2020, the team developed a plant-roving robot and a perception platform to gather large-scale crop data. During its five years at X, Mineral created AI models and a learning platform to improve crop resilience, optimize yields, and support sustainable farming.

In January 2023, Mineral spun out as an independent Alphabet company. Elliott Grant is the CEO. The company collaborated with international partners, including the Alliance of Biodiversity International and CIAT, and its technologies have been tested on crops ranging from strawberries and soybeans to bananas and wheat. In 2024, Mineral's technology was acquired by Driscoll's and John Deere for integration into their agriculture operations.

=== Skip ===
Skip is a mobility startup that originated at X a project exploring assistive wearables for aging populations. Initially, the project explored soft robotics and sensor-driven systems to support walking and reduce strain on joints. In 2020, the team developed prototypes that used lightweight actuators and machine learning to anticipate and assist human movement. Skip spun out of X under the leadership of Kathryn Zealand and Anna Roumiantseva, focusing on commercial applications. In 2024, Skip, in partnership with outdoor gear company Arc'teryx, introduced MO/GO, a hiking-oriented exoskeleton integrated into technical pants. Marketed as an "ebike for hiking," the device reduces physical effort for users while blending into outdoor apparel design and represents one of the first consumer-focused exoskeleton products developed from X research.

=== Tidal ===
Tidal began at X as a project to apply underwater AI and robotics to make ocean industries more sustainable. The team developed vision systems to monitor fish health, feeding, and environmental factors in aquaculture, first testing with prototypes in Norwegian salmon farms. In 2023, Tidal was named a TIME Best Invention for Undersea AI. In 2024, Tidal became an independent company with funding led by Perry Creek Capital. Its commercial platform, including the Orca camera system, now tracks millions of fish daily and automates feeding to reduce waste.

=== Heritable Agriculture ===
Heritable Agriculture is a biotechnology company using machine learning to accelerate crop breeding and improve resilience to climate change. The company's platform analyzes large genomic and environmental datasets to identify traits linked to yield, nutrition, and sustainability, validated through thousands of field trials in the United States. Spun out from X as an independent company in 2025, Heritable has raised funding from FTW Ventures, Mythos Ventures, and SVG Ventures. Its work extends beyond food crops to forestry, where it partners on projects to restore native species and increase biodiversity.

=== iyO ===
iyO is a startup spun out of X that develops AI-powered earbuds for natural language computing. Its flagship iyO One can isolate sounds, enhance conversations, and connect to voice-based "agents." The company has raised $21 million from investors, including Alphabet, and Horizons Ventures.

=== Delta ===
Delta focused on reducing food waste and fighting hunger by creating an intelligent food distribution system. The team developed software to connect grocers, logistics companies, and food banks, alongside a computer vision and machine learning system to help commercial kitchens track and categorize their food waste. Delta graduated to Google in 2020, where its technology contributed to Chorus and helped launch Open Product Recovery, a platform that uses shared data standards to distribute surplus food to organizations in need.

=== Everyday Robots ===
Everyday Robots was an X project focused on developing general-purpose learning robots capable of operating autonomously in unstructured human environments, such as homes and offices. The team built an integrated hardware and software platform that utilized machine intelligence to allow robots to learn from human demonstrations, the experiences of other robots, and cloud-based simulations. In January 2023, the project graduated from X, and its technology and hardware were consolidated into Google DeepMind's robotics efforts.

=== Others ===
- The Google Contact Lens, a smart contact lens that aims to assist people with diabetes by constantly measuring the glucose levels in their tears, was announced by Google on January 16, 2014. This project, the nanodiagnostics project to develop a cancer-detecting pill, and other life sciences efforts are now being carried out by Verily.
- Google Brain is now a deep learning research project at Google which started as an X project. Considered one of the biggest successes, this one project has produced enough value for Google to more than cover the total costs of X, according to Astro Teller.
- Google Watch (now Wear OS)
- Gcam (now Pixel Camera)
- Project Insight, mapping indoor spaces, now integrated into Google Maps
- Flux, a tool for designing more eco-friendly buildings
- Daydream View
- Chronicle, X’s moonshot for cybersecurity, which graduated to an independent company in January 2018. In July 2019, Chronicle joined Google Cloud’s portfolio of security offerings, and its products integrated into VirusTotal malware intelligence services, Backstory investigation flows, and more.

== Projects with unknown status ==
- A 2011 New York Times article stated that computer scientist Johnny Chung Lee was working on web of things-related research; this might have evolved into the Tango project (2014–2018), which was done not at Google X but at Google ATAP.
- A 2015 article in The Wall Street Journal stated that Google X had, since 2012, been working on long-lasting smartphone batteries.

== Abandoned or rejected projects ==
- In October 2013, the existence of four Google barges was revealed, with the vessels registered under the dummy corporation By And Large. Two of the barges had a superstructure whose construction was kept under the utmost secrecy. These were eventually revealed to be experimental floating interactive learning centers, though perhaps due to the cost of meeting federal maritime safety regulations, this project was cancelled and the barges dismantled and sold.
- Foghorn, a project to produce liquid hydrocarbon fuel for vehicles using sea water as a source of carbon dioxide, extracted using membrane technology, and also as a source of hydrogen, using electrolysis. The project was killed by X in 2016 and the results published in 2018.
- Calcifer explored using lighter-than-air vehicles to move freight at lower cost in countries with poor transportation infrastructure. Abandoned in 2014 due to the high cost of prototyping and limited expected impact.

Projects that X has considered and rejected include a space elevator, which was deemed to be currently infeasible; a hoverboard, which was determined to be too costly relative to the societal benefits; a user-safe jetpack, which was thought to be too loud and energy-wasting; and teleportation, which was found to violate the laws of physics.

== Approach ==
In February 2016, Astro Teller, the X "Captain of Moonshots", gave a TED talk in which he described the X approach to projects. Unusual characteristics of the approach included constantly trying to find reasons to kill off projects by tackling the hardest parts first, and both celebrating and rewarding staff when projects were killed off due to failure.

On May 17, 2018, an internal video entitled The Selfish Ledger was leaked by The Verge, regarding reshaping society through total data collection. A spokesperson stated that, "This is a thought-experiment by the Design team from years ago that uses a technique known as ‘speculative design' to explore uncomfortable ideas and concepts in order to provoke discussion and debate. It's not related to any current or future products."

In August 2026, X announced the launch of Series X Capital, an independent venture fund founded by Gideon Yu. Series X receives the initial external review of X's projects and provides capital and operational support for selected spinouts, with Alphabet retaining an ownership stake in the new entities. The fund has invested in former X projects such as Taara, Chorus, and Anori, and has also led a funding round for the Alphabet subsidiary Verily.

== Acquisitions ==
A number of companies have been acquired and merged into X, covering a diverse range of skills including wind turbines, robotics, artificial intelligence, humanoid robots, robotic arms, and computer vision. In 2013, X acquired Makani Power, a US company which developed tethered wings/kites with mounted wind turbines for low cost renewable energy generation. In 2014, it acquired product design and mechanical engineering firm Gecko Design, whose previous products included the Fitbit activity tracker and low-cost computers. As of 2015, X has acquired 14 companies, including Redwood Robotics, Meka Robotics, Boston Dynamics, Bot & Dolly, and Jetpac. In June 2017, X sold Boston Dynamics to SoftBank Group, which sold it to Hyundai Motor Company in December 2020.

== Campus ==
A reporter from Bloomberg Businessweek visited the site in 2013 and described it as "ordinary two-story red-brick buildings about a half-mile from Google's main campus. There's a burbling fountain out front and rows of company-issued bikes, which employees use to shuttle to the main campus."

== Controversies ==
On 25 October 2018, The New York Times published an exposé entitled "How Google Protected Andy Rubin, the 'Father of Android'". The company subsequently announced that "48 employees have been fired over the last two years" for sexual misconduct. A week after the article appeared, Google X executive Rich DeVaul resigned pursuant to a complaint of sexual harassment.

== See also ==
- Artificial intelligence
- Glossary of artificial intelligence
- Google Labs
- Skunkworks project
