= Arigatō =

Arigatō, Arigatou or in popular culture Arigato (to show appreciation in Japanese or to say "thank you") may refer to:

- Arigatō (manga) by Naoki Yamamoto

== Music ==
=== Songs ===
- "Arigato" (B'z song), 2004
- "Arigatō" (Flow song), 2008
- Arigato (Kokia song), 1999
- "Arigatō" (Sekai no Doko ni Ite mo), a 2010 single by Hey! Say! JUMP

=== Albums ===
- Arigato!, an album by John Davis
- Arigato (Hank Jones album)
- Arigatō (Hatsune Okumura album), 2008
- Arigatō (Miyuki Nakajima album), 1977

== See also ==
- Aragoto (荒事), a style of kabuki acting
- domo arigato (disambiguation)
- Mr. Roboto ("dōmo arigatō, Mr. Roboto")
