= Hatsune Okumura =

Hatsune Okumura 奥村 初音
- Born: October 11, 1990 (age 35)
- Origin: Osaka, Japan
- Genres: Pop, R&B
- Occupation: Singer-songwriter
- Instrument: Vocals
- Years active: 2007–present
- Label: Avex Trax
- Website: www.hatsune.info/

Hatsune Okumura (奥村 初音, Okumura Hatsune) (born October 11, 1990) is a Japanese singer-songwriter signed to Avex Trax. Born and raised in Osaka, Okumura started to write lyrics and compose music at the age of five after attending music competitions. On September 5, 2007, she debuted with the single "Koi, Hanabi". In 2009, Okumura started to perform mononymously as Hatsune (初音).

== History ==
- By grade five, Okumura had attended many music contests and started to write lyrics and music.
- Attended Littlecat music school in Osaka before debut.
- While attending school, Okumura continued to create music and to attend live events. She once attended the convention live "Showcase Live" by avex, where her performance was highly recognized.
- Major debuted with single "Koi, Hanabi" (恋、花火) in 2007. Since she attends school in Osaka, all the promotional events occur inside Osaka.

== Discography ==
=== Albums ===
- 2008: Arigatō

=== Singles ===
- 2007: "Koi, Hanabi"
- 2008: "Suna"
- 2008: "Honto wa ne"
- 2009: "Koi ni Deatta Natsu" (恋に出逢った夏, "The Summer I Found Love") feat. Ken the 390
- 2009: "Akai Ito" (アカイ糸, "Red string of fate") feat. Ken the 390
- 2010: "Mata Aitai" (また逢いたい, "I Want to See You Again")

=== Digital Releases ===
- 2008.04.23 "Sotsugyō (Mata, Aō ne)"
