= Meka Robotics =

Former San Francisco–based robotic systems company

- Type: Subsidiary
- Industry: Robotics
- Founded: 2006; 20 years ago
- Founder: Aaron Edsinger; Jeff Weber
- Headquarters: San Francisco, California, United States
- Owner: Alphabet Inc.
- Parent: X
- Website: mekabot.com

Meka Robotics was a San Francisco–based company that made robotic systems.

== History ==
Founded in 2006 by Aaron Edsinger and Jeff Weber, it was originally a spin-off of the MIT Computer Science and Artificial Intelligence Laboratory before the founders relocated to San Francisco.

In 2007, the company provided a forearm and hand for MIT Media Lab's new robot, Nexi.

In 2008, the company teamed with the Socially Intelligent Machines Lab at the Georgia Institute of Technology to develop Simon, an upper torso humanoid platform for human robot interaction.

In 2012, the company teamed with the Human Centered Robotics Group at the University of Texas at Austin to develop HUME, a "bipedal robot for human-centered hyper-agility." The robot demonstrates the ability to control and maneuver its legs, but is unable to walk with it.

In 2012, the company entered into a joint venture with Willow Garage and SRI International to found Redwood Robotics, a company specializing in robotic arms.

On December 5, 2013, Google X acquired Meka Robotics. By the end of December, Google had acquired seven other robotics companies.

== Products ==
- M1 Mobile Manipulator
- S2 Humanoid Head

== See also ==
- Domo (robot)
