= Koi, Hanabi =

"恋、花火"
- CD+DVD Cover

Single by 奥村初音

from the album ありがとう
- B-side: "やさしさのカタチ"
- Released: September 5, 2007
- Recorded: 2007
- Genre: Pop, J-pop, pop rock
- Songwriter(s): 奥村初音

奥村初音 singles chronology
"恋、花火" (2007)	"砂" (2008)

Koi, Hanabi (恋、花火, Love, Fireworks) is Hatsune Okumura's debut single. It was released on September 5, 2007, by Avex Trax.

== Overview ==
The CD+DVD edition includes the Koi, Hanabi short film starring AAA's Takahiro Nishijima, Mitsuki Tanimura and Kenichi Endō.

== Specifics ==
- Artist: Okumura Hatsune
- Title: Koi, Hanabi (恋、花火, Love, Fireworks)
- Code: AVCD-31288/B CD+DVD; AVCD-31289 CD Only
- Release Date: 2007.09.05
- Price: ¥1,890 CD+DVD; ¥1,050 CD Only

== Track list ==
=== CD section ===
1. Koi, Hanabi (恋、花火, Love, Fireworks)
2. Yasashisa no Katachi (やさしさのカタチ, Shape Of Affection)
3. Koi, Hanabi (恋、花火, Love, Fireworks) (Instrumental)
4. Yasashisa no Katachi (やさしさのカタチ, Shape Of Affection) (Instrumental)

=== DVD Section ===
1. "Koi, Hanabi" Short Film (「 恋、花火 」ショートフィルム, "Love, Fireworks" Short Film)

== Charts ==
=== Oricon chart positions ===
Chart (2008)	Daily Rank	Weekly Rank
Japanese Oricon Singles Chart	38	60
