= Flutter (American company) =

Gesture recognition technology company

Flutter Ltd.
- Type: Subsidiary
- Industry: PC, Mobile, Internet, Gestures
- Genre: Music, Photo, Video
- Founded: 2010; 16 years ago
- Founder: Navneet Dalal, Mehul Nariyawala
- Headquarters: San Francisco, California, USA
- Products: Flutter App
- Owner: Alphabet Inc.
- Parent: X
- Website: flutterapp.com

Flutter is a gesture recognition technology startup based in San Francisco, California, United States. Founded by Navneet Dalal and Mehul Nariyawala, the company received early-stage funding from Y Combinator and was acquired by Google in October 2013.

== History ==
The company's first product, Flutter App, allowed users to control apps such as iTunes, Spotify, VLC, and QuickTime using hand gestures. The app utilizes gesture recognition technology that works with the webcam on a user's computer. Instead of requiring separate hardware, such as Microsoft's Kinect, Flutter makes use of the built-in webcam to recognize the gestures of a person's hands between one and six feet away.

The program does not require expensive hardware and is not designed for large movements, such as those used when playing video games—this limits its use to navigational duties. The company plans to achieve profit by licensing the technology to software companies that can then integrate Flutter into their own apps.

Nariyawala stated: "Flutter wants to power the eyes of our devices—in the same way that Siri functions as the iPhone’s ears." Flutter was acquired by Google in October 2013 for US$40 million.
