= Honto wa ne =

2008 single by Hatsune Okumura

- CD+DVD

Single by Hatsune Okumura

from the album Arigatō
- B-side: "Natsu iro no koi"
- Released: July 23, 2008
- Recorded: 2008
- Genre: Pop, J-pop, pop rock
- Length: 4:40
- Label: Avex Trax
- Songwriter: Hatsune Okumura

Hatsune Okumura singles chronology
"Suna" (2008)	"Honto wa ne" (2008)

Honto wa ne (ホントはね, Really?) is Hatsune Okumura's third single. It was released on July 23, 2008, by Avex Trax.

== Overview ==
Honto wa ne (ホントはね, Really?) comes exactly three months after the release of Okumura's first digital single in on April 23. Honto wa ne (ホントはね, Really?) was used as the theme song to the television dorama Seigi no Mikata (正義の味方, Ally of Justice).

== Specifics ==
- Artist: Okumura Hatsune
- Title: Honto wa ne (ホントはね, Really?)
- Code: AVCD-31458/B CD+DVDAVCD-31459 CD only
- Release Date: 2008.07.23
- Price: ¥1,890 CD+DVD; ¥1,050 CD only

== Track list ==
=== CD section ===
1. Honto wa ne (ホントはね, Really?)
2. Natsuiro no Koi (夏色の恋, Summer Colored Love)
3. Honto wa ne (ホントはね, Really?) (inst.)
4. Natsuiro no Koi (夏色の恋, Summer Colored Love) (inst.)

=== DVD section ===
1. Honto wa ne (ホントはね, Really?) (music clip)

== Charts ==
=== Oricon chart positions ===
Chart (2008)	Daily Rank	Weekly Rank
Japanese Oricon Album Charts	48	69
