= Lenovo Phab 2 Pro =

Android smartphone

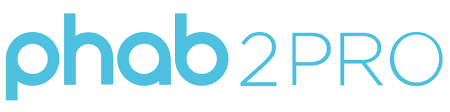

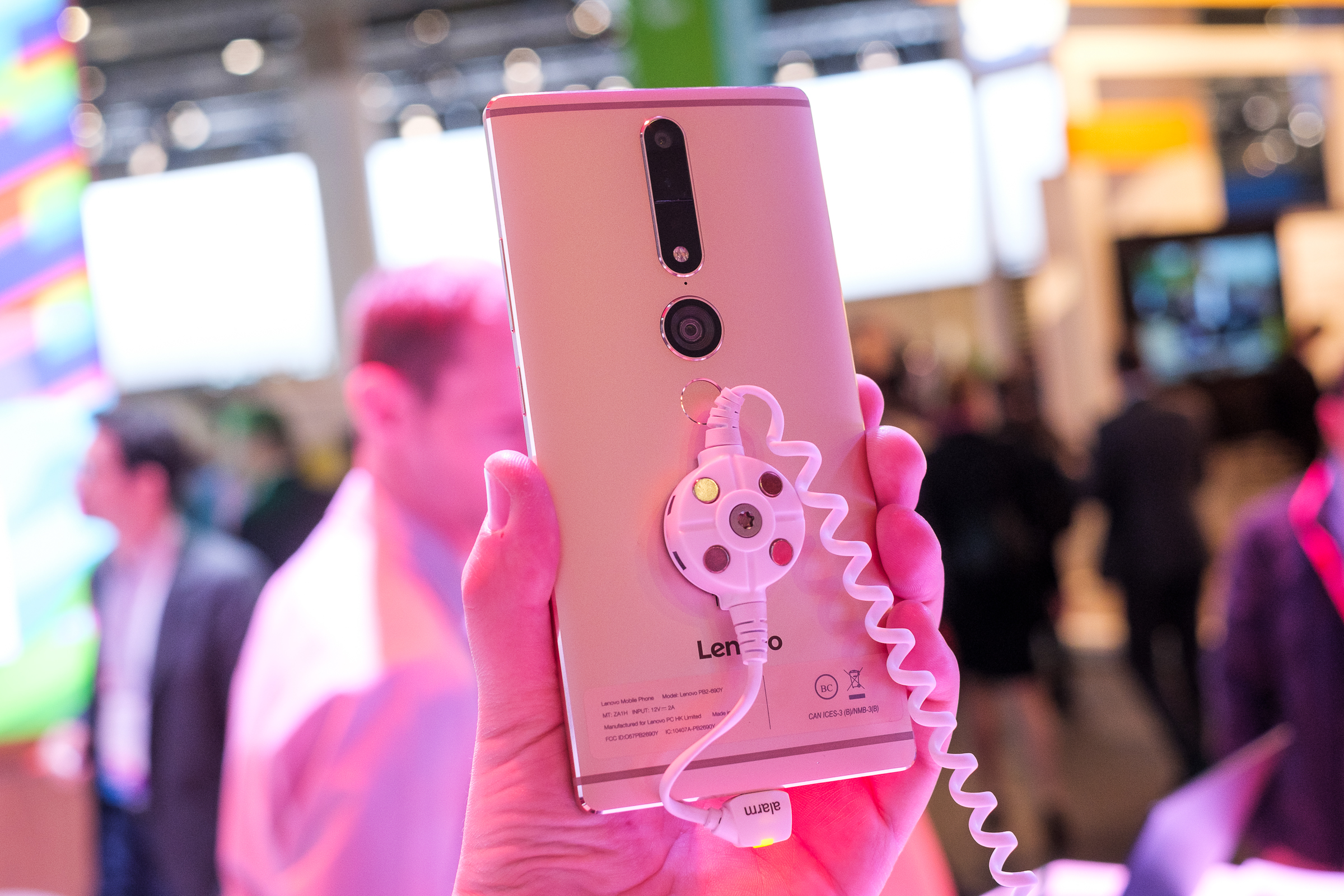
- Phab 2 Pro on MWC 2017
- Manufacturer: Lenovo Group Limited
- Type: Touchscreen smartphone
- Series: Phab
- First released: November 2016; 9 years ago
- Related: Lenovo Phab 2 Lenovo Phab 2 Plus
- Compatible networks: GSM: 850/900/1800/1900; HSDPA: 850 / 900 / 1900 / 2100; LTE:, VoLTE 1(2100), 2(1900), 3(1800), 5(850), 7(2600), 8(900), 20(800), 38(2600), 40(2300), 41(2500)
- Form factor: Slate
- Dimensions: 179.8 mm (7.08 in) H; 88.6 mm (3.49 in) W; 10.7 mm (0.42 in) D
- Weight: 259 g (9.1 oz)
- Operating system: Android 6.0.1 "Marshmallow"
- System-on-chip: Qualcomm MSM8976 Snapdragon 652
- CPU: Octa-core (4x1.4GHz Cortex-A53 & 4x1.8GHz Cortex-A72)
- GPU: Adreno 510
- Memory: 4GB
- Storage: 64GB
- Removable storage: Supports up to 256 GB microSD
- Battery: Non-removable Li-Ion 4050 mAh battery
- Rear camera: 16MP, f/2.0, phase detection autofocus, depth & motion tracking sensors/Fisheye,1080p video recording with Dolby Audio Capture 5.1
- Front camera: 8MP, f/2.2, 1.4 μm pixel size Camera
- Display: 6.4 in (160 mm) IPS LCD capacitive touchscreen 1440 x 2560 pixels, ~459 ppi, 16M colors
- Connectivity: Wi-Fi 802.11a/b/g/n/ac (2.4 & 5GHz), dual-band, WiFi Direct, hotspot; Bluetooth v4.0, A2DP, Low-energy; 4G/LTE

The Lenovo Phab 2 Pro is an Android phablet, developed and produced by Lenovo and first released in November 2016 at an MSRP of US$499. The device is notable for being the first consumer smartphone to support Google Tango augmented reality (AR) technology.

== Hardware ==
The Phab 2 Pro features a Qualcomm Snapdragon 652 system-on-chip (SoC), which Lenovo claims to be specially optimized for Tango. In addition, it contains 4 GB of LPDDR3 RAM and 64GB of onboard storage, expandable with a microSD slot supporting up to 256 GB. In the United States, the Phab 2 Pro supports the networks of carriers AT&T and T-Mobile (and MVNOs using the networks of those companies), but not those operated by Verizon or Sprint (or MVNOs using the networks of those companies). The device uses a nano-SIM for network connectivity, with dual-SIM functionality available if the user forgoes the use of a microSD card. The Phab 2 Pro is powered by a 4050mAh lithium ion battery, which supports rapid charging over microUSB when using a compatible wall adapter.

The Phab 2 Pro's screen is an IPS LCD at a display resolution of 2560x1440 pixels, with 459 ppi pixel density at a diagonal size of 6.4 inches. This makes the screen unusually large for a smartphone class device, as most mainstream smartphones at the time of the Phab 2 Pro's release (Google Pixel XL, Samsung Galaxy S7 edge, iPhone 7 Plus among others) measured at or under 5.5" diagonally. However, the Google Tango reference implementation was a 7-inch tablet, so it has been argued that Lenovo's hardware is relatively small.

The hardware focus of the Phab 2 Pro is the camera and sensor system on the back of the phone that enables Tango, encompassing a depth sensor and motion sensor in addition to the 16-megapixel main camera. Working in tandem, the three sensors combine with Google's Tango software API to offer functionality such as accurate digital measurement of three-dimensional objects, to-scale realistic simulation of furniture and other objects in a real-life space, and AR-augmented video games.

The Phab 2 Pro uses Dolby Atmos audio technology for audio playback and Dolby Audio Capture for audio recording, as well as a three-microphone array with active noise cancellation. Audio can be played back through a 3.5mm audio jack, over Bluetooth, or with the device's single bottom-firing loudspeaker.

The Phab 2 Pro features a rear-mounted circular fingerprint sensor, which can be used to securely unlock the device, but not to authorize mobile payments due to the device lacking NFC functionality.

== Design ==
The Phab 2 Pro's design encompasses a glass display flanked by aluminum upper and lower bezels, with the lower bezel housing three capacitive navigation buttons (the Android standard of back, home, and recent apps, from left to right), and the upper bezel housing a telephone loudspeaker for calls, an 8-megapixel front-facing camera, and a light sensor and proximity sensor. The back and sides of the phone are aluminum, with glass camera and sensor covers and two plastic antenna lines on the top and bottom; the cameras and sensors protrude slightly from the back itself, which features a slight curve similar to that found on the Nexus 6. The main camera is topmost on the back, followed by the depth sensor, both of which are housed in a vertical pill-shaped protrusion with a glass covering. Below the main camera and depth sensor housing is the circular motion sensor, immediately below which is the fingerprint sensor. The bottom of the phone houses a microUSB port for charging and data transfer, flanked by identical microphone and speaker grilles. The top of the phone houses the 3.5mm headphone jack. The left side of the phone (from the front) houses a two-button volume rocker above a power button, while the right side houses the ejectable SIM/microSD tray.

== Software ==
The Phab 2 Pro runs a lightly customized version of Android 6.0 "Marshmallow," in addition to the Google Tango front-end applications and a Dolby Atmos application. Lenovo has included certain software features intended to aid in operation of the device with regard to its large size, such as being able to tilt the device to one side to move a keyboard or numerical input pad to that side.

== Reception ==
Critical reception to the Phab 2 Pro was moderate. The device received praise for its innovation in the AR field and successful implementation of the Tango protocol, although reviewers noted that actual Tango software was extremely taxing on the phone's battery and certain high-intensity Tango applications did not run smoothly due to the arguably mid-range processor. The device size was divisive in particular, with some reviewers claiming it was well-executed and necessary to support Tango in a smartphone platform, while others said that it was altogether too unwieldy for the majority of users. The rear camera also attracted criticism from most reviewers, who noted its poor low-light performance and lack of consistency in accurately focusing.
