= Suna (name) =

Suna is a feminine Turkish given name. In Turkish, it means drake, tall, beautiful and elegant.

== People ==
- Suna Kan (1936–2023), Turkish violinist of classical music
- Suna Kıraç (1941–2020), member of the Turkish Koç family
- Suna Murray (born 1955), American figure skater
- Suna Selen (born 1939), Turkish actress
- Suna Yıldızoğlu (born 1955), Turkish actress
