= Suna, Sunsky District, Kirov Oblast =

Suna Суна
- Urban-type settlement
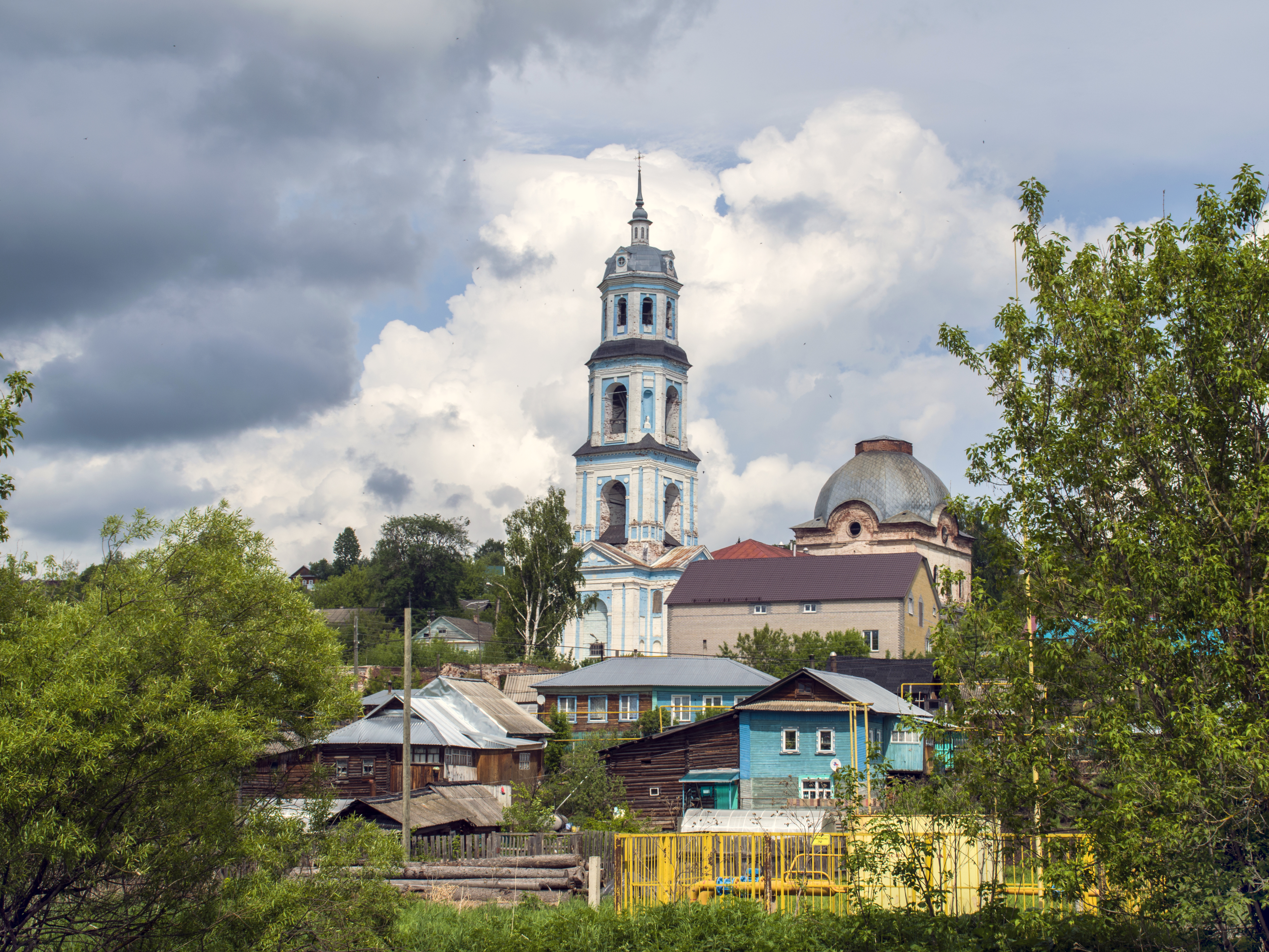
- Interactive map of Suna
- Location of Suna Suna (Kirov Oblast)
- Coordinates: 57.8334°N 50.0613°E
- Country: Russia
- Federal subject: Kirov Oblast
- Administrative district: Sunsky District
- Founded: 1571

Population (2010 Census)
  - Total: 2,199
  - Estimate (2025): 1,853 (−15.7%)
- Time zone: UTC+3 (MSK)
- Postal code: 612450
- OKTMO ID: 33637151051

Suna (Russian: Суна́) is an urban locality (an urban-type settlement) in Sunsky District of Kirov Oblast, Russia. Population: 2,199 (2010 census); 2,475 (2002 census); 3,559 (1989 Soviet census).
