= Suna (song) =

Single by Hatsune Okumura

from the album Arigatō
- B-side: "Kimi wo Omou to..."
- Released: February 13, 2008
- Recorded: 2008
- Genre: Pop, J-pop, pop rock
- Songwriter(s): Hatsune Okumura

Hatsune Okumura singles chronology
"Koi, Hanabi" (2007)	"Suna" (2008)	"Honto wa ne" (2008)

Suna (砂, Sand) is Hatsune Okumura's second single. It was released on February 13, 2008 by Avex Trax.

== Overview ==
The release of Suna (砂, Sand) came almost six months since her last single and did not receive a tie-in.

== Specifics ==
- Artist: Okumura Hatsune
- Title: Suna (砂, Sand)
- Code: AVCD-31373/B CD+DVD; AVCD-31374 CD Only
- Release Date: 2008.02.13
- Price: ¥1,890 CD+DVD; ¥1,050 CD Only

== Track list ==
=== CD Section ===
1. Suna (砂, Sand)
2. Kimi wo Omou to... (君を想うと・・・, Think Of You...)
3. Suna (砂, Sand) (Instrumental)
4. Kimi wo Omou to... (君を想うと・・・, Think Of You...) (Instrumental)

=== DVD Section ===
1. Suna (砂, Sand) (Music Clip)

== Charts ==
=== Oricon Chart Positions ===
Chart (2008)	Daily Rank	Weekly Rank
Japanese Oricon Album Charts	N/A	150
