= Sunsky District =

Sunsky District Сунский район (Russian)
- District
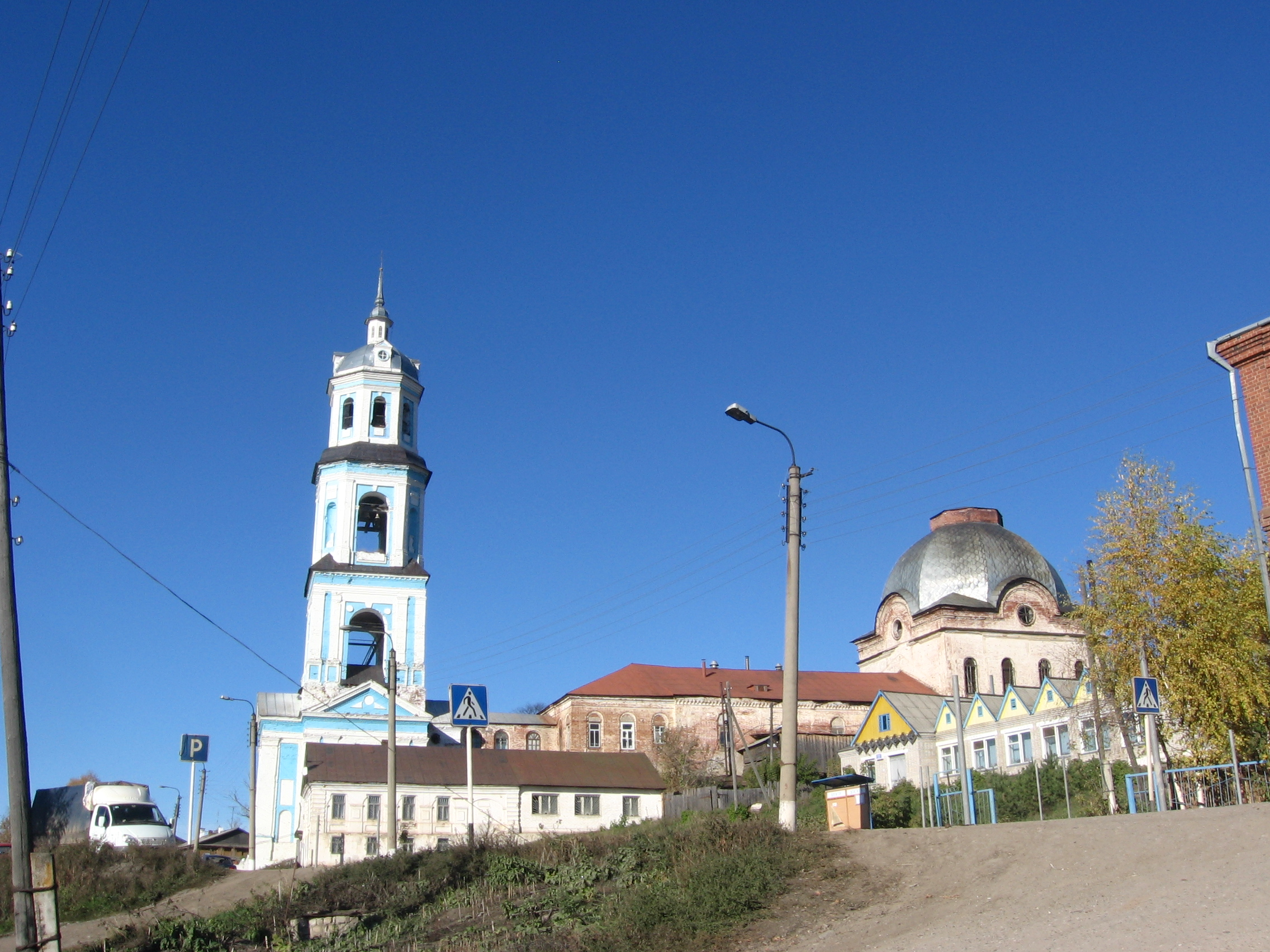
- Church of the Ascension (1786), village of Suna, Sunsky District

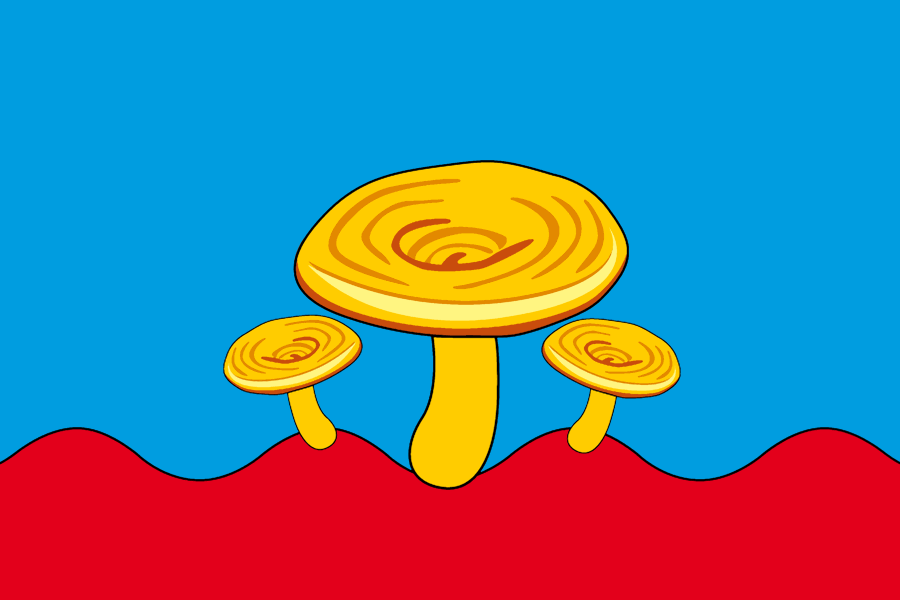
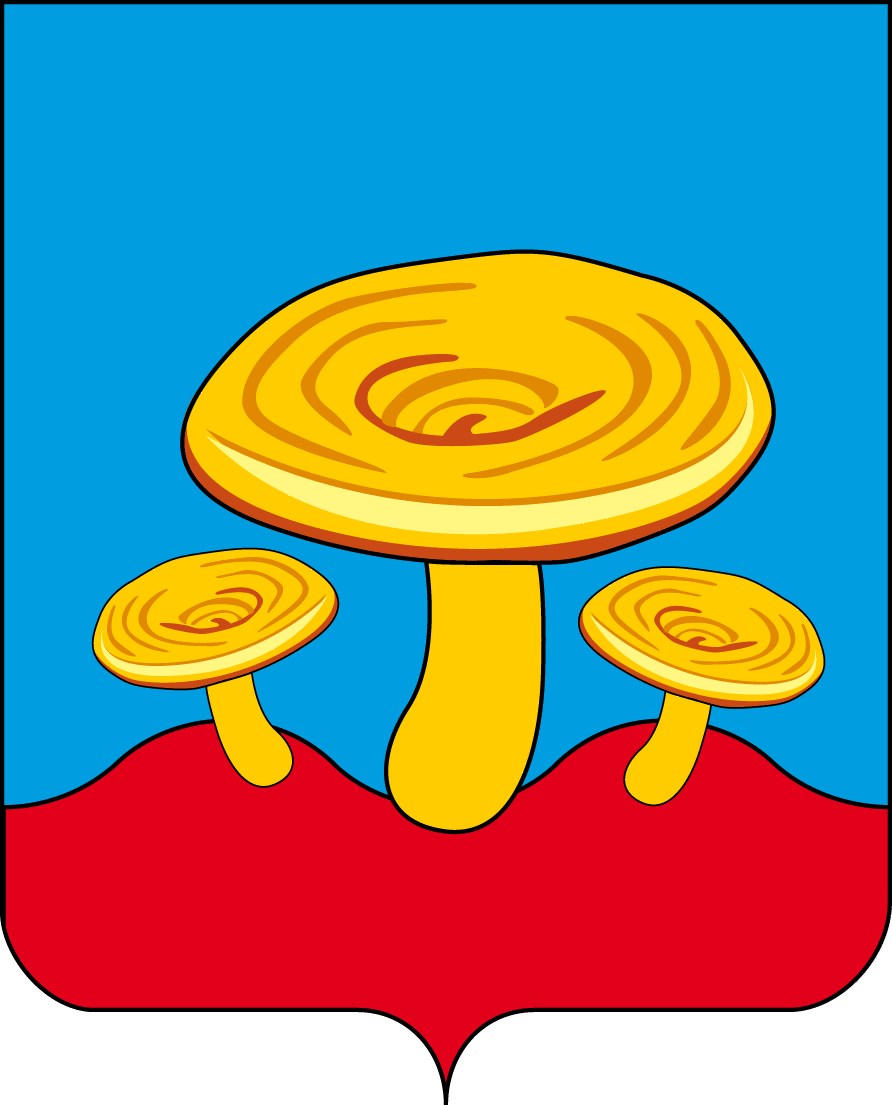
- Flag Coat of arms
- Location of Sunsky District in Kirov Oblast
- Coordinates: 57°50′09″N 50°05′10″E
- Country: Russia
- Federal subject: Kirov Oblast
- Established: 10 July 1929
- Administrative center: Suna

Area
  - Total: 1,260 km^{2} (490 sq mi)

Population (2010 Census)
  - Total: 6,784
  - Density: 5.38/km^{2} (13.9/sq mi)
  - Urban: 32.4%
  - Rural: 67.6%

Administrative structure
  - Administrative divisions: 1 Urban-type settlements, 3 Rural okrugs
  - Inhabited localities: 1 urban-type settlements, 64 rural localities

Municipal structure
  - Municipally incorporated as: Sunsky Municipal District
  - Municipal divisions: 1 urban settlements, 3 rural settlements
- Time zone: UTC+3 (MSK)
- OKTMO ID: 33637000
- Website: http://admsuna.ru/

Sunsky District (Russian: Су́нский райо́н) is an administrative and municipal district (raion), one of the thirty-nine in Kirov Oblast, Russia. It is located in the center of the oblast. The area of the district is 1,260 square kilometers (490 sq mi). Its administrative center is the urban locality (an urban-type settlement) of Suna. Population: 6,784 (2010 census); 8,636 (2002 Census); 10,150 (1989 Soviet census). The population of Suna accounts for 32.4% of the district's total population.
