= Arigatō (Hatsune Okumura album) =

Arigatou (ありがとう, Thank You)

Studio album by Hatsune Okumura
- Released: September 3, 2008
- Recorded: 2007–2008
- Genre: Pop, J-pop, pop rock
- Label: Avex Trax

Singles from Arigatō
- 1. "恋、花火" Released: September 5, 2007; 2. "砂" Released: February 13, 2008; 3. "ホントはね" Released: July 23, 2008

Arigatou (ありがとう, Thank You) is Hatsune Okumura's debut studio album. It was released on September 3, 2008. It reached the 50th place on the Oricon Weekly Albums Chart.

== Overview ==
Arriving a year after her debut, Arigatou (ありがとう, Thank You) features her first three singles, Koi, Hanabi (恋、花火, Love, Fireworks), Suna (砂, Sand), Honto wa ne (ホントはね, Really?) and a b-side, Natsuiro no Koi (夏色の恋, Summer Color Of Love), with eight new tracks. It doesn't feature her digital single, Sotsugyou ~Mata, Aou ne~ (卒業～また、会おうね～, Graduation ~Let's Meet Again~)

== Track listings ==
=== CD ===
1. Ashita Haretara (あした晴れたら)
2. Kutsuzure (くつずれ)
3. Natsu Iro no Koi (夏色の恋, Summer Color Of Love)
4. Hikoukigumo (ひこうき雲)
5. Suna (砂, Sand)
6. Koi, Hanabi (恋、花火, Love, Fireworks)
7. Kodoku no Senshi (孤独の戦士, Soldier Of Solitude)
8. Honto wa ne (ホントはね, Really?)
9. Monochrome no Sora (モノクロの空, Monochrome Sky)
10. Kitto Kanau yo (きっと叶うよ)
11. Futari (ふたり, Together)
12. Arigatou (ありがとう, Thank You)

=== DVD ===
1. Koi, Hanabi (Music Clip, Short Ver.)
2. Suna (Music Clip, Lip Ver.)
3. Honto wa ne (Music Clip, Lip Ver.)
4. Monochrome no Sora (Music Clip)

== Charts ==
Chart (2008)	Daily rank	Weekly rank
Japanese Oricon Album Charts	33	50
