= Domo arigato =

Domo arigato (どうもありがとう, Dōmo arigatō) (pronounced [doꜜːmo aɾiꜜɡatoː]) is a Japanese phrase meaning "Thanks a lot" or "Thank you very much". It may also refer to:

== Film ==
- Domo Arigato (film), a 1972 Japanese 3-D film

== Music ==
- Domo arigato, a catchphrase in the 1983 song "Mr. Roboto" by Styx
- Domo Arigato, a 1985 album by the Durutti Column
- "Domo arigato", a 2009 song from You Make Me Feel (Bonfire album)

== See also ==
- Arigatō (disambiguation)
