= Johnny Lee (computer scientist) =

American computer scientist

- Born: Johnny Chung Lee; 1979 (age 46–47)
- Awards: Innovators Under 35 (2008)

Academic background
- Education: University of Virginia (BS); Carnegie Mellon University (PhD)

Academic work
- Discipline: Computer science
- Institutions: University of Southern California; Microsoft; Google

Johnny Chung Lee (born 1979) is an American computer engineer known for his inventions related to the Wii Remote. He is involved with human-computer interaction.

== Education ==
Lee earned a Bachelor of Science degree in computer engineering at the University of Virginia in 2001 and a Ph.D. at Carnegie Mellon University's Human–Computer Interaction Institute.

== Career ==
In 2001, Lee was a research intern at the University of Southern California's Integrated Media Systems Center. From 2002 to 2004, he was a research intern at the Mitsubishi Electric Research Laboratories. He worked as a research intern at Microsoft in 2005 and remained with the company as a researcher until 2011. While Lee was a core member of Kinect development team, he approached Adafruit Industries with the idea of a driver development contest and personally financed it.

Sometime in 2008, Lee posted video demos and sample code at his website taking advantage of the high resolution (1024×768 Pixels) high frame-rate (100 Hz) IR camera built-in into the controller of the Wii video game console, the Wii Remote, for finger tracking, low-cost multipoint interactive whiteboards, and head tracking for desktop VR displays. This was the subject for his presentation at the prestigious TED conference in the same year, where he demonstrated several such applications. The WiimoteProject forum has become the discussion, support, and sharing site for Lee's Wii Remote projects and other newer developments.

Lee was named one of the world's top 35 innovators under 35 (TR35) in 2008. After that, Lee was hired by Microsoft to work on their Kinect project. He was later hired at Google to work on Project Tango. Lee was an early member of the team at X Development and later moved to Google AI where he focused on robotics.

Lee's other projects include an interactive whiteboard, 3D head tracking, finger tracking, and a DIY telepresence robot. His YouTube videos have received over 10 million views, with the Wii Remote head tracking project being his most viewed. He also demonstrated several of these applications at events such as TED, and has been featured on popular websites such as Slashdot, Gizmodo, hackedgadgets, Popular Science, Wired, and Engadget several times. Various magazines, newspapers and television programs have featured interviews with Lee, and he has also made appearances at events such as Maker Faire.

Electronic Arts had initially stated that Lee's Wii Remote head tracking technology would appear as an Easter egg in the game Boom Blox, but later announced that the feature had been removed.
