= Skunkworks project =

Type of research and development project

A skunkworks project is a project developed by a relatively small and loosely structured group of people, generally within a larger organization, who research and develop a project, often with a very large degree of autonomy, primarily for the sake of radical innovation. The term originated with Lockheed Martin's Skunk Works, a highly classified, internal research and development group.

== Definition ==
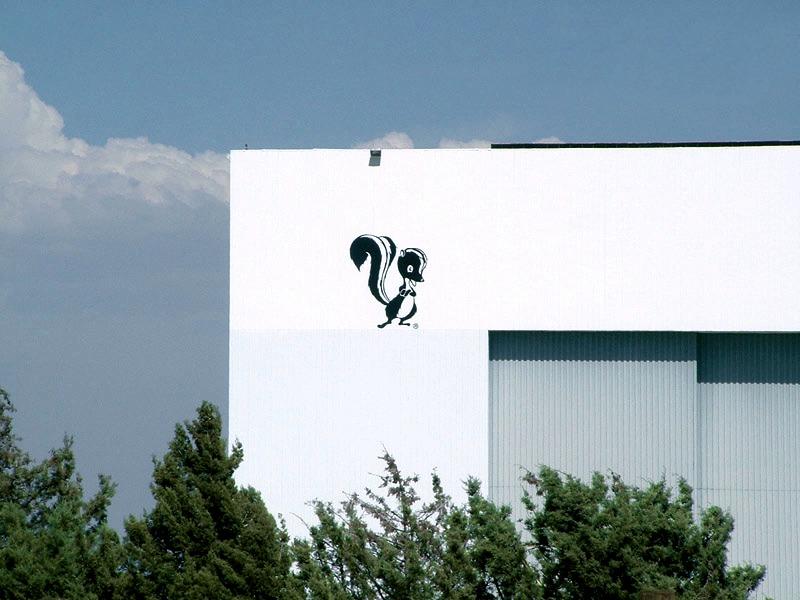
The Lockheed Martin Skunk Works hangar in Palmdale, California

Everett Rogers defined skunkworks as an "enriched environment that is intended to help a small group of individuals design a new idea by escaping routine organizational procedures".

The term originated during World War II when the P-80 Shooting Star was designed by Lockheed’s Advanced Development Projects Division in Burbank, California, under similar circumstances. A closely guarded incubator was set up in a circus tent next to a plastics factory in Burbank. The strong smells that wafted into the tent made the Lockheed R&D workers think of the foul-smelling “Skonk Works” factory in Al Capp’s Li'l Abner comic strip.

The "organizing genius" Clarence "Kelly" Johnson was the first team leader of Skunk Works and designer of the P-80, U-2, SR-71 and many more. Skunk Works was run using "Kelly's 14 Rules":

1. The Skunk Works manager must be delegated practically complete control of his program in all aspects. He should report to a division president or higher.
2. Strong but small project offices must be provided both by the military and industry.
3. The number of people having any connection with the project must be restricted in an almost vicious manner. Use a small number of good people (10% to 25% compared to the so-called normal systems).
4. A very simple drawing and drawing release system with great flexibility for making changes must be provided.
5. There must be a minimum number of reports required, but important work must be recorded thoroughly.
6. There must be a monthly cost review covering not only what has been spent and committed but also projected costs to the conclusion of the program. Don't have the books 90 days late, and don't surprise the customer with sudden overruns.
7. The contractor must be delegated and must assume more than normal responsibility to get good vendor bids for subcontract on the project. Commercial bid procedures are very often better than military ones.
8. The inspection system as currently used by the Skunk Works, which has been approved by both the Air Force and Navy, meets the intent of existing military requirements and should be used on new projects. Push more basic inspection responsibility back to subcontractors and vendors. Don't duplicate so much inspection.
9. The contractor must be delegated the authority to test his final product in flight. He can and must test it in the initial stages. If he doesn't, he rapidly loses his competency to design other vehicles.
10. The specifications applying to the hardware must be agreed to well in advance of contracting. The Skunk Works practice of having a specification section stating clearly which important military specification items will not knowingly be complied with and reasons therefore is highly recommended.
11. Funding a program must be timely so that the contractor doesn't have to keep running to the bank to support government projects.
12. There must be mutual trust between the military project organization and the contractor with very close cooperation and liaison on a day-to-day basis. This cuts down misunderstanding and correspondence to an absolute minimum.
13. Access by outsiders to the project and its personnel must be strictly controlled by appropriate security measures.
14. Because only a few people will be used in engineering and most other areas, ways must be provided to reward good performance by pay not based on the number of personnel supervised.

Since its origination with Skunk Works, the term was generalized to apply to similar high-priority R&D projects at other large organizations which feature a small elite team removed from the normal working environment and given freedom from management constraints.

The term typically refers to technology projects developed in semi-secrecy, such as Google X Lab. Other famous skunkworks were Microsoft Research, special teams at Boeing, and the lab of about 50 people established by Steve Jobs to develop the Macintosh computer, located behind the Good Earth Restaurant in Cupertino.

== Evolution of the idea ==
The Economist notes that the expectations for the products developed by skunkworks have changed in the 21st century from "something that makes their competitors say 'Wow'" to "something that makes their competitors' customers say 'Wow'". Rather than sequestering skunkworks, the companies now tend to promote communication between them and marketing, design, and accounting departments.

== See also ==
- Bootlegging (business)
- Hacker (programmer subculture)
