= Artificial eye =

Artificial eye may refer to:

- Visual prosthesis, functioning implant designed to restore sight
- Ocular prosthesis, non-functioning cosmetic replacement for a lost eye
- Curzon Artificial Eye, film distributor in the UK, specialising in foreign-language films
- Retinal implant, is a visual prosthesis for restoration of sight to patients blinded by retinal degeneration
