= Mark S. Humayun =

Pakistani-American ophthalmologist, engineer, scientist, inventor and academic

- Known for: Co-inventing the Argus Series retina implants
- Medical career
- Profession: Ophthalmologist, Engineer, Scientist and Inventor
- Institutions: USC Eye Institute

Mark S. Humayun is a Pakistani-American ophthalmologist, engineer, scientist, inventor and academic – the only ophthalmologist elected a member of both U.S. National Academies of Medicine and Engineering. He is a university professor with joint appointments at the Keck School of Medicine of USC and the USC Viterbi School of Engineering.

In 2011, Humayun was elected as a member into the National Academy of Engineering for contributions to development and clinical implementation of the visual prosthesis for restoration of sight.

Humayun was named a recipient of the National Medal of Technology and Innovation in 2015 and received the award from U.S. President Barack Obama in 2016. The award recognizes "those who have made lasting contributions to America’s competitiveness and quality of life and helped strengthen the Nation’s technological workforce." Humayun co-invented the Argus Series retina implants, which are manufactured by Second Sight, and are intended to restore sight to the blind. The Argus Series implants were named by Time Magazine among the top 10 inventions of 2013.

He has more than 100 patents and patent applications, and was nominated by R&D Magazine as Innovator of the Year in 2005. He was recently nominated to the National Academy of Inventors, the highest professional distinction accorded to academic inventors.

Humayun was named director of the USC Institute of Biomedical Therapeutics (IBT) in 2012, director of the National Science Foundation BioMimetic MicroElectronic Systems Engineering Research Center, and director of the Department of Energy Artificial Retina Project. He was also inaugural director of the USC Eye Institute and interim chair of the USC Department of Ophthalmology.

== Personal life ==
Humayun saw his own grandmother lose her vision while in medical school, which motivated him to switch his medical specialty to ophthalmology and specifically innovative research.

Humayun's paternal grandfather was Lt. Col. Dr Ilahi Bakhsh, the personal physician of Muhammad Ali Jinnah (one of his ancestors took the same role for the ruler of Punjab, Maharaja Ranjit Singh), while his maternal grandfather was Aslam Khattak who served as Governor of the North-West Frontier Province (1973-1974) under Zulfikar Ali Bhutto.

== Education ==
Humayun received his B.S. from Georgetown University in 1984, his M.D. from Duke University in 1989, and his Ph.D. from the University of North Carolina, Chapel Hill in 1994. He completed his ophthalmology residency at Duke Eye Center and fellowships in both vitreoretinal and retinovascular surgery at the Wilmer Ophthalmological Institute at Johns Hopkins Hospital. He stayed on as faculty at Johns Hopkins where he rose to the rank of associate professor before moving to USC in 2001.

== Career ==
Humayun is a clinician-researcher at the University of Southern California (USC) Eye Institute, and a professor of ophthalmology and biomedical engineering for the Keck School of Medicine of USC and USC Viterbi School of Engineering. He holds the Cornelius J. Pings Chair in Biomedical Sciences. He was named Professor of Ophthalmology, Biomedical Engineering, Cell and Neurobiology in 2001. He served as Interim Chair, Department of Ophthalmology, in 2013. He was named Inaugural Director of the USC Eye Institute in 2013. He was named Director of the USC Sensory Science Institute in 2013.

Humayun has served as a Visiting Associate in Medical Engineering at the California Institute of Technology since 2014.

He serves on the board of directors for the American Society of Retina Specialists, and the Board of Directors of Replenish, Inc.

== Research ==
Humayun's research projects focus on the treatment of debilitating eye diseases through advanced engineering.

=== Argus II retinal prosthesis ===
Humayun co-invented the Argus II retinal prosthesis, a retinal implant designed to help patients with genetic retinitis pigmentosa. More than 30 clinical trial participants in Argus II trial launched in 2007 at sites in the U.S. and Europe. It was approved by the FDA in February 2013. The first USC Eye Institute patient received the implant post-FDA approval in June 2014, and saw light one week following activation of device.

=== Stem cell research ===
Humayun is one of two principal investigators working with USC Eye Institute researchers to study how to replace damaged retinal pigment epithelial (RPE) cells with stem cells to restore sight, a potential cure for age-related macular degeneration, the leading cause of permanent impairment of reading and fine or close-up vision among people aged 65 years and older. This research is funded by a grant from California Institute for Regenerative Medicine.
