= Harriet Ryan =

American investigative journalist

- Born: Pennsylvania, United States
- Education: Columbia University (BA)
- Occupation: Journalist
- Organization: Wall Street Journal
- Awards: Pulitzer Prize in 2019

Harriet Ryan is an American investigative journalist for the Wall Street Journal. She is one of the recipients of the Pulitzer Prize for Investigative Reporting in 2019.

== Biography ==
Ryan grew up in Pennsylvania and attended Lancaster Catholic High School. In 1996, she graduated from Columbia University, where she had Andrew Delbanco as her advisor. She is the third person in her class to have won the Pulitzer Prize, besides journalist Jodi Kantor and composer Tom Kitt. She was also a former editor of the Columbia Daily Spectator.

She started her journalism career at Asbury Park Press after graduating from Columbia. She then worked at Court TV for eight years, during which she covered high-profile trials of Michael Jackson, Phil Spector, and Scott Peterson before joining the Los Angeles Times in 2008. Her focus has been on the "celebrity–industrial complex," the manufacture and exploitation of fame and celebrity in Los Angeles and its vicinity.

Ryan was nominated for a Gerald Loeb Award for Investigative in 2017. In 2019, she won the Pulitzer Prize for Investigative Reporting with her colleagues Matt Hamilton and Paul Pringle for revealing complaints of sexual misconduct against former University of Southern California gynecologist George Tyndall.
