= Helmet-mounted display =

Headworn device projecting imagery to the eyes

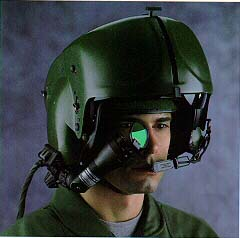
The Integrated Helmet and Display Sight System (IHADSS)

30 mm M230 chain gun turret on a Boeing AH-64 Apache being aimed with a helmet-mounted sight

In aviation, a helmet-mounted display (HMD) is a head-worn device that uses digital displays and optics to project imagery and/or symbology to the wearer's eyes. It provides visual information to the user where head protection is required – most notably in military aircraft. The display-optics assembly can be attached to a helmet or integrated into the design of the helmet. An HMD provides the pilot with situation awareness, an enhanced image of the scene, and in military applications cue weapons systems, to the direction their head is pointing. Applications which allow cuing of weapon systems are referred to as helmet-mounted sight and display (HMSD) or helmet-mounted sights (HMS).

== Overview ==
Aviation HMDs are intended to provide at-a-glance information to the operator. This enables the pilot to retain situational awareness, as they do not need to look down at their instruments.

Today, they may also be used to direct High Off Boresight (HOBS) weapons with a targeting reticle, such as the AIM-9X Sidewinder or R-73 Vympel infrared homing short range air to air missile. This allows a pilot to point and cue the infrared seeker of the missile at a target without having to acquire the target on the radar system and cue it that way. This is especially an advantage in a dogfight because the aircraft does not need to be pointed at the enemy to fire the missile, and the pilot only needs to track their target visually within the turning limit of the infrared seeker. Attack helicopters such as the AH-64 Apache have increasingly begun mounting helmet-cued turrets, which follow the gunner's vision and can be thusly aimed without looking down at a screen.

It is also possible to visually display sensor video for various purposes while maintaining situation awareness. This includes verifying correct targeting without looking down into the cockpit, and viewing outside terrain in situations where vision is obstructed or reduced.

== History ==
In 1962, Hughes Aircraft Company revealed the Electrocular, a compact CRT, head-mounted monocular display that reflected a TV signal onto a transparent eyepiece.

One of the first aircraft with simple HMD devices appeared for experimental purpose in the mid-1960s to aid in targeting heat seeking missiles. The US Navy's Visual Target Acquisition System (VTAS), made by Honeywell Corporation that was flown in early 1970s in F-4J and 1974–78 ACEVAL/AIMVAL on U.S. F-14 and F-15 fighters. VTAS received praise for its effectiveness in targeting off-boresight missiles, but the U.S. did not pursue fielding it except for integration into late-model Navy F-4 Phantoms equipped with the AIM-9 Sidewinder from 1969.

HMDs were also introduced in helicopters during this time – examples include the Boeing AH-64 Apache with the Integrated Helmet and Display Sighting System (IHADSiSy) demonstrated in 1985.

The MiG-29 was fielded in 1985 with an HMD and a high off-boresight weapon (R-73), giving them an advantage in close maneuvering engagements. Several nations responded with programs to counter the MiG-29/HMD/R-73 (and later Su-27) combination once its effectiveness was known, principally through access to former East German MiG-29s that were operated by the unified German Air Force.

One successful HMD was the Israeli Air Force Elbit DASH series, fielded in conjunction with the Python 4, in the early 1990s. The U.S., UK, and Germany pursued a HMD combined with ASRAAM systems. Technical difficulties led to the U.S. abandoning ASRAAM, instead funding development of the AIM-9X and the Joint Helmet-Mounted Cueing System in 1990. American and European fighter HMDs became widely used in the late 1990s and early 2000s.

The first civilian use of HMD on aircraft was the Elbit SkyLens HMD on ATR 72/42 airplane.

== Technology ==
While conceptually simple, implementation of aircraft HMDs is quite complex. There are many variables:

- precision – the angular error between the line-of-sight and the derived cue. The position of the helmet is what is used to point the missile; it thus must be calibrated and fit securely on the pilot's head. The line between the pilot's eye and the reticle on the visor is known as the line of sight (LOS) between the aircraft and the intended target. The user's eye must stay aligned with the sight; in other words, current HMDs cannot sense where the eye is looking, but can place a predicted impact point marker between the eye and the target.
- latency or slew rate – how much lag there is between the helmet and the cue.
- field of regard – the angular range over which the sight can still produce a suitably accurate measurement.
- weight and balance – total helmet weight and its center of gravity, which are particularly important under high "g" maneuvers. Weight is the largest problem faced by fighter aircraft HMD designers. This is much less a concern for helicopter applications, making elaborate helicopter HMDs common.
- safety and flightdeck compatibility, including ejection seat compatibility.
- optical characteristics – calibration, sharpness, distant focus (or collimation, a technique used to present the images at a distant focus, which improves the readability of images), monocular vs. binocular imagery, eye dominance, and binocular rivalry.
- durability and ability to handle day-to-day wear and tear.
- cost, including integration and training.
- fit and interfacing the aviator's head to the aircraft – head anthropometry and facial anatomy make helmet-fitting a crucial factor in the aviator's ability to interface with the aircraft systems. Misalignment or helmet shift can cause an inaccurate picture.

=== Head tracking ===
HMD designs must sense the orientation (elevation, azimuth and roll) and in some cases the position (x, y, and z) of the pilot's head relative to the airframe with sufficient precision even under high "g", vibration, and during rapid head movement. This is known as 3D tracking. Five basic methods are used in current HMD technology – inertial, optical, electromagnetic, sonic, and hybrid. Hybrid trackers use a combination of sensors such as inertial and optical to improve tracking accuracy, update rate, and latency.

==== Hybrid inertial optical ====
Hybrid inertial tracking systems employ a sensitive Inertial Measurement Unit (IMU) and an optical sensor to provide reference to the aircraft. MEMS based IMUs benefit from high update rates such as 1,000 Hz but suffer from precession and drift over time, so they cannot be used alone. In this class of tracker, the optical sensor is used to constrain IMU drift. As a result, hybrid inertial/optical trackers feature low latency and high accuracy. The Thales Scorpion HMCS and HMIT HMDs utilize a tracker made by InterSense called the Hybrid Optical-based Inertial Tracker (HObIT).

==== Optical ====
Optical systems employ infrared emitters on the helmet (or flightdeck) infrared detectors in the flightdeck (or helmet), to measure the pilot's head position. The main limitations are restricted fields of regard and sensitivity to sunlight or other heat sources. The MiG-29/AA-11 Archer system uses this technology. The Cobra HMD as used on both the Eurofighter Typhoon and the JAS39 Gripen both employ the optical helmet tracker developed by Denel Optronics (now part of Zeiss Optronics).

==== Electromagnetic ====
Electromagnetic sensing designs use coils (in the helmet) placed in an alternating field (generated in the flightdeck) to produce alternating electrical voltages based on the movement of the helmet in multiple axes. This technique requires precise magnetic mapping of the flightdeck to account for ferrous and conductive materials in the seat, flightdeck sills and canopy to reduce angular errors in the measurement.

==== Sonic ====
Acoustic sensing designs use ultrasonic sensors to monitor the pilot's head position while being updated by computer software in multiple axes. Typical operating frequencies are in the 50 to 100 kHz range and can be made to carry audio sound information directly to the pilot's ears via subcarrier modulation of the ultrasonic sensing signals.

=== Optics ===
Older HMDs typically employ a compact CRT embedded in the helmet, and suitable optics to display symbology on to the pilot's visor or reticle, focused at infinity. Modern HMDs have dispensed with the CRT in favor of micro-displays such as liquid crystal on silicon (LCOS) or liquid crystal display (LCD) along with an LED illuminator to generate the displayed image. Advanced HMDs can also project FLIR or night vision imagery. A recent improvement is the capability to display color symbols and video.

== Major systems ==
Systems are presented in rough chronological order of initial operating capability.

=== Integrated Helmet And Display Sight System (IHADSS) ===
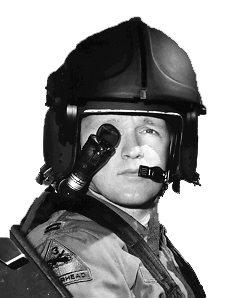
IHADSS

In 1985, the U.S. Army fielded the AH-64 Apache and with it the Integrated Helmet and Display Sighting System (IHADSS), a new helmet concept in which the role of the helmet was expanded to provide a visually coupled interface between the aviator and the aircraft. The Honeywell M142 IHADSS is fitted with a 40°-by-30° field of view, video-with-symbology monocular display. IR emitters allow a slewable thermographic camera sensor, mounted on the nose of the aircraft, to be slaved to the aviator's head movements. The display also enables Nap-of-the-earth night navigation. IHADSS is also used on the Italian Agusta A129 Mangusta.

Media related to IHADSS at Wikimedia Commons

=== ZSh-5 / Shchel-3UM ===
The Russian designed Shchel-3UM HMD design from 1981, has been fitted to the ZSh-5 series helmet (and later ZSh-7 helmets), and has been used on the MiG-29 and Su-27 in conjunction with the R-73 missile (NATO reporting name: AA-11 Archer). The HMD/Archer combination gave the MiG-29 and Su-27 a significantly improved close combat capability.

=== Display and sight helmet (DASH) ===
The Elbit Systems DASH III was the first modern Western HMD to achieve operational service. Development of the DASH began during the mid-1980s, when the IAF issued a requirement for F-15 and F-16 aircraft. The first design entered production around 1986, and the current GEN III helmet entered production during the early to mid-1990s. The current production variant is deployed on IDF F-15, and F-16 aircraft. Additionally, it has been certified on the F/A-18 and F-5. The DASH III has been exported and integrated into various legacy aircraft, including the MiG-21. It also forms the baseline technology for the US JHMCS.

The DASH GEN III is a wholly embedded design, where the complete optical and position sensing coil package is built within the helmet (either USAF standard HGU-55/P or the Israeli standard HGU-22/P) using a spherical visor to provide a collimated image to the pilot. A quick-disconnect wire powers the display and carries video drive signals to the helmet's cathode-ray tube (CRT). DASH is closely integrated with the aircraft's weapon system, via a MIL-STD-1553B bus. Latest model DASH IV is currently integrated on India's HAL Tejas.

=== Joint Helmet-Mounted Cueing System (JHMCS) ===
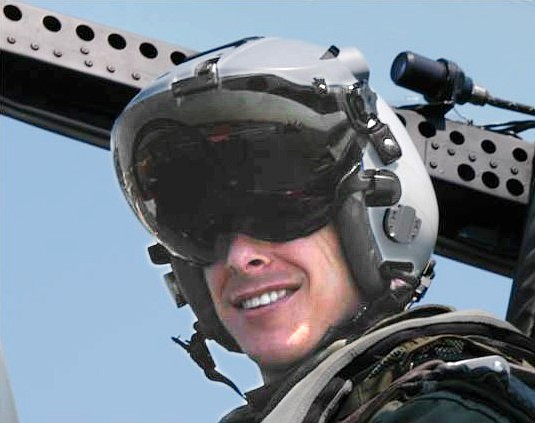
JHMCS

After the U.S. withdrawal from ASRAAM, the U.S. pursued and fielded JHMCS in conjunction with the Raytheon AIM-9X, in November 2003 with the 12th and 19th Fighter Squadrons at Elmendorf AFB, Alaska. The Navy conducted RDT&E on the F/A-18C as lead platform for JHMCS, but fielded it first on the F/A-18 Super Hornet E and F aircraft in 2003. The USAF is also integrating JHMCS into its F-15E, F-15C, and F-16C aircraft.

JHMCS is a derivative of the DASH III and the Kaiser Agile Eye HMDs, and was developed by Vision Systems International (VSI), a joint venture company formed by Rockwell Collins and Elbit (Kaiser Electronics is now owned by Rockwell Collins). Boeing integrated the system into the F/A-18 and began low-rate initial production delivery in fiscal year 2002. JHMCS is employed in the F/A-18A++/C/D/E/F, F-15C/D/E/S/K/SG/SA/QA/EX, and F-16 Block 40/50/50+/60/70 with a design that is 95% common to all platforms.

Unlike the DASH, which is integrated into the helmet itself, JHMCS assemblies attach to modified HGU-55/P, HGU-56/P or HGU-68/P helmets. JHMCS employs a newer, faster digital processing package, but retains the same type of electromagnetic position sensing as the DASH. The CRT package is more capable, but remains limited to monochrome presentation of cursive symbology. JHMCS provides support for raster scanned imagery to display FLIR/IRST pictures for night operations and provides collimated symbology and imagery to the pilot. The integration of the night-vision goggles with the JHMCS was a key requirement of the program.

When combined with the AIM-9X, an advanced short-range dogfight weapon that employs a Focal Plane Array seeker and a thrust vectoring tail control package, JHMCS allows effective target designation up to 80 degrees either side of the aircraft's nose. In March 2009, a successful 'Lock on After Launch' firing of an ASRAAM at a target located behind the wing-line of the ‘shooter' aircraft, was demonstrated by a Royal Australian Air Force (RAAF) F/A-18 using JHMCS. The U.S. Air Force and Air National Guard would later replace the JHMCS with the more modern Scorpion Helmet Mounted Integrated Targeting (HMIT) on its F-16C fleet.

=== TARGO II ===
Elbit designed system is used by Qatar and India on Rafale F3R

=== Helmet Mounted Integrated Targeting (HMIT)/Scorpion ===
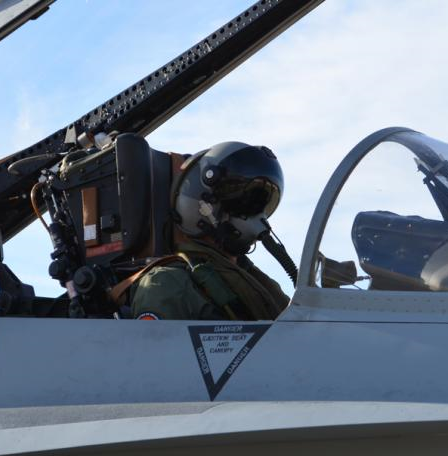
Scorpion Helmet Mounted Display

Gentex/Raytheon introduced the Scorpion Head/Helmet-Mounted Display System to the military aviation market in 2008. In 2010, Scorpion was the winner of the USAF/ANG/AFRes Helmet Mounted Integrated Targeting (HMIT) program. The Gentex helmet mounted display and motion tracking division was subsequently acquired by Thales in 2012. The HMIT system was qualified and deployed on both A-10 and F-16 platforms in 2012. Starting in 2018, the installed base of HMIT systems went through a helmet tracker upgrade. The original AC magnetic tracking sensor was replaced by an inertial-optical hybrid tracker called Hybrid Optical based Inertial Tracker (HObIT). The HObIT was developed by InterSense and tested by Thales in 2014.

Scorpion has the distinction of being the first HMD introduced and deployed that can display full-color conformal symbology. It is used along with the aircraft mission system to cue the aircraft targeting pods, gimbaled sensors, and high off-boresight missiles. Scorpion provides an "eyes out" capability: even when objects may be obscured from view, Scorpion can provide visual graphic cues to the near-field display. Unlike most HMDs which require custom helmets, Scorpion was designed to be installed on a standard issue HGU-55/P and HGU-68/P helmets and is fully compatible with standard issue U.S. Pilot Flight Equipment without special fitting. It is also fully compatible with standard unmodified AN/AVS-9 Night Vision Goggles (NVG) and Panoramic Night Vision Goggles (PNVG). Pilots, using Scorpion, can view both the night vision image and the symbols on the display.

Scorpion uses a novel optical system featuring a light-guide optical element (LOE) which provides a compact color collimated image to the pilot. The display can be positioned by each pilot, thereby eliminating the need for precise helmet position on the user's head or special helmet fitting. Software correction accommodates the display position, providing an accurate image to the pilot and allowing the Scorpion HMCS to be installed onto a pilot's existing helmet. A visor can be deployed in front of the display providing protection during ejection. The visor can be clear, glare, high contrast, gradient, or laser protective. For night operations, an NVG mount can be installed in place of the visor during flight. Once installed, NVGs can be placed in front of the display, thus allowing the pilot to view both the display symbols as well as the NVG image simultaneously.

Scorpion is also used by Tactical Air Support Inc. on F-5AT, by French Air Force for Rafale F4, by the Spanish Air Force on EF-18s, the AC-130W Stinger II Gunship, the F-22 Raptor, and Belgian Air Force F-16AM/BM and U.S. Air Force and Air National Guard F-16C (replacing the JHMCS).

=== Aselsan AVCI ===
Aselsan of Turkey is working to develop a similar system to the French TopOwl Helmet, called the AVCI Helmet Integrated Cueing System. The system will also be utilized into the T-129 Turkish Attack Helicopter.

=== TopOwl-F(Topsight/TopNight) ===
The French thrust vectoring Matra MICA (missile) for its Dassault Rafale and late-model Mirage 2000 fighters was accompanied by the Topsight HMD by Sextant Avionique. TopSight provides a 20 degree FoV for the pilot's right eye, and cursive symbology generated from target and aircraft parameters. Electromagnetic position sensing is employed. The Topsight helmet uses an integral embedded design, and its contoured shape is designed to provide the pilot with a wholly unobstructed field of view.

TopNight, a Topsight derivative, is designed specifically for adverse weather and night air to ground operations, employing more complex optics to project infrared imagery overlaid with symbology. The most recent version the Topsight has been designated TopOwl-F, and is qualified on the Mirage-2000-5 Mk2 and Mig-29K.

=== Eurofighter Helmet-Mounted Symbology System ===
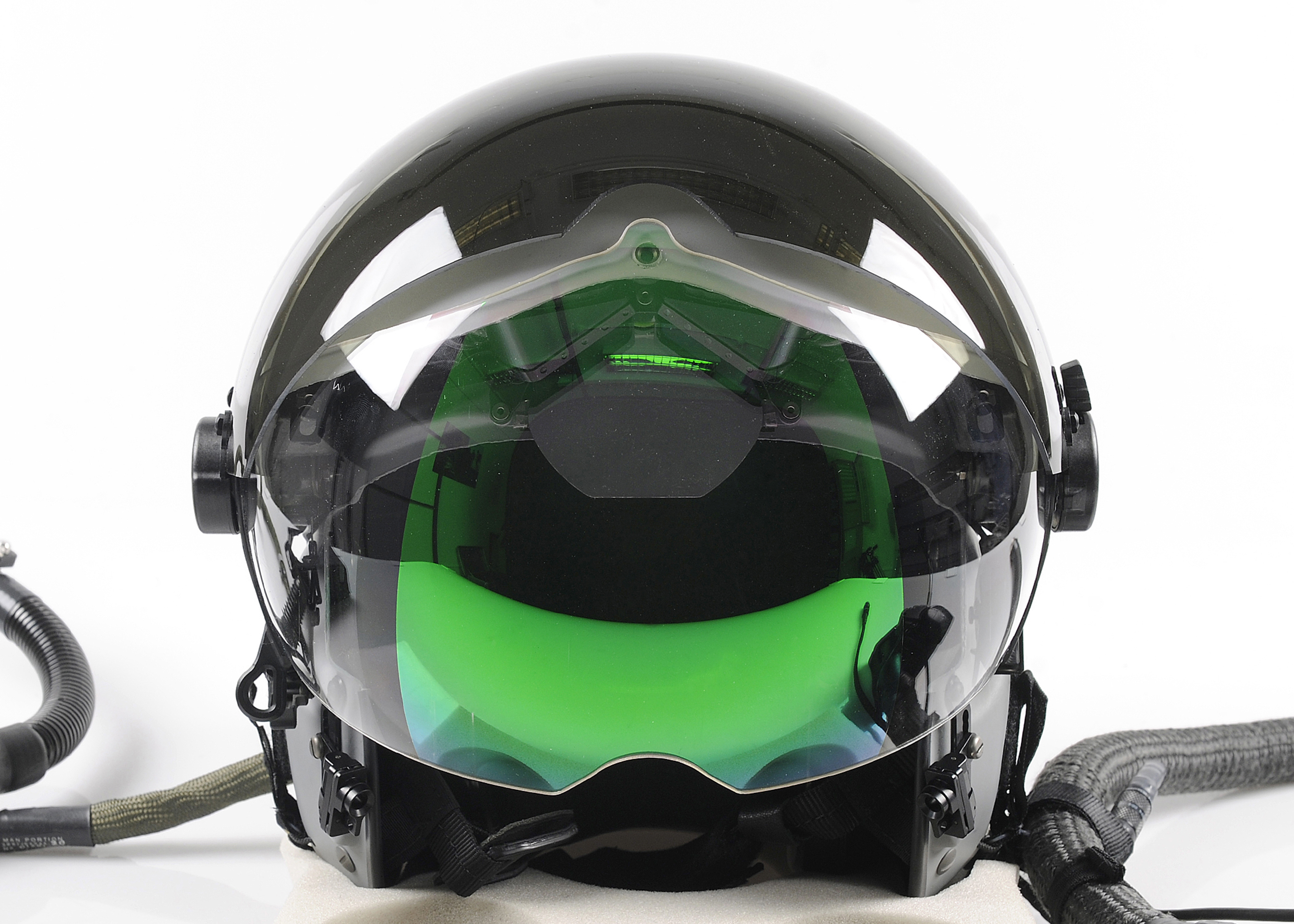
HMSS

The Eurofighter Typhoon utilizes the Helmet-Mounted Symbology System (HMSS) developed by BAE Systems and Pilkington Optronics. Named the Striker and later version Striker II, it is capable of displaying both raster imagery and cursive symbology, with provisions for embedded NVGs. As with the DASH helmet, the system employs integrated position sensing to ensure that symbols representing outside-world entities move in line with the pilot's head movements.

=== Helmet-Mounted Display System ===
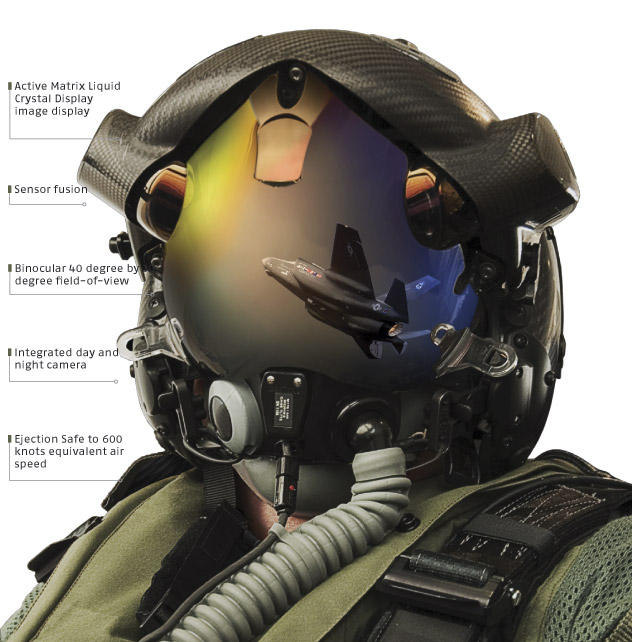
Helmet-Mounted Display System for the F-35 Lightning II

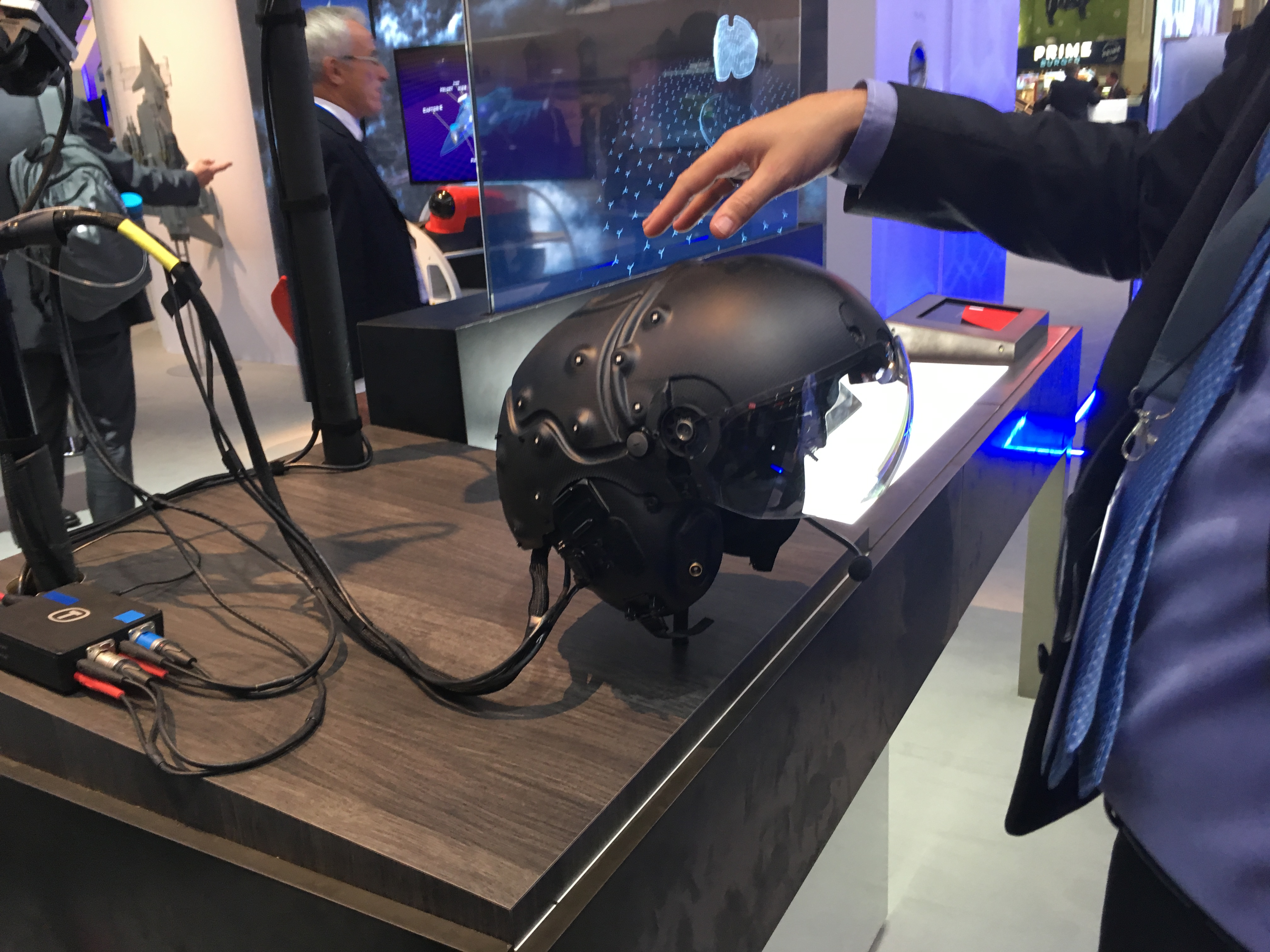
Helmet Mounted System Striker II from BAE System on DSEI-2019

Vision Systems International (VSI; the Elbit Systems/Rockwell Collins joint venture) along with Helmet Integrated Systems, Ltd. developed the Helmet-Mounted Display System (HMDS) for the F-35 Joint Strike Fighter aircraft. In addition to standard HMD capabilities offered by other systems, HMDS fully utilizes the advanced avionics architecture of the F-35 and provides the pilot video with imagery in day or night conditions. Consequently, the F-35 is the first tactical fighter jet in 50 years to fly without a HUD. A BAE Systems helmet was considered when HMDS development was experiencing significant problems, but these issues were eventually worked out. The Helmet-Mounted Display System was fully operational and ready for delivery in July 2014.

=== Jedeye ===
Jedeye is a new system recently introduced by Elbit Systems especially to meet Apache and other rotary wing platform requirements. The system is designed for day, night and brownout flight environments. Jedeye has a 70 x 40 degree FOV and 2250x1200 pixels resolution.

=== Cobra ===
Sweden's JAS 39C/D Gripen fighter utilizes the Cobra HMD. The helmet is a further development and refinement of the Striker helmet developed for the Eurofighter by BAE Systems. The refinement is done by BAE in partnership with Denel Cumulus.

== Future technology ==
- Rockwell Collins ESA Vision Systems (RCEVS) is developing a standard view Night Vision Cueing & Display (NVCD) for the U.S. Navy.
- eye tracking – eye trackers measure the point of gaze relative to the direction of the head, allowing the system to compute where the user is looking. These systems are not currently used in aircraft.
- direct retinal projection – systems that project information directly onto the wearer's retina with a low-powered laser (virtual retinal display) are also in experimentation.

== See also ==
- Head-mounted display (HMD)
- Virtual reality (VR)
- Augmented reality
- VRML
- Index of aviation articles

== Bibliography ==
- Melzer & Moffitt (1997). Head Mounted Displays: Designing for the user. McGraw Hill.
