= Artificial vision =

Artificial vision may refer to:

- Computer vision
- Visual prosthesis
