= Argus retinal prosthesis =

Electronic retinal implant

Visual processing through a bionic eye

Argus retinal prosthesis, also known as a bionic eye, is an electronic retinal implant manufactured by the American company Second Sight Medical Products. It is used as a visual prosthesis to improve the vision of people with severe cases of retinitis pigmentosa. The Argus II version of the system was approved for marketing in the European Union in March 2011, and it received approval in the US in February 2013 under a humanitarian device exemption. The Argus II system costs about US$150,000, excluding the cost of the implantation surgery and training to learn to use the device. Second Sight had its IPO in 2014 and was listed on Nasdaq.

Production and development of the prosthesis was discontinued in 2020, but taken over by the company Cortigent in 2023.

== Medical use ==
The Argus II is specifically designed to treat people with retinitis pigmentosa. The device was approved with data from a single-arm clinical trial that enrolled thirty people with severe retinitis pigmentosa; the longest follow-up on a trial subject was 38.3 months. People in the trial received the implant in only one eye and tests were conducted with the device switched on, or switched off as a control. With the device switched on, about 23% of the subjects had improvements in their ability to see; all had been at 2.9 or higher on the LogMAR scale and improvements ranged from just under 2.9 to 1.6 LogMAR – the equivalent of 20/1262 reading ability. 96% of the subjects were better able to identify a white square on a black computer screen; 57% were more able to determine the direction in which a white bar moved across a black computer screen. With the device switched on, about 60% were able to accurately walk to a door that was 20 feet (6 m) away, as opposed to only 5% with the device switched off; 93% had no change in their perception of light.

== Side effects ==
Among the thirty subjects in the clinical trial, there were nine serious adverse events recorded, including lower than normal intraocular pressure, erosion of the conjunctiva, reopening of the surgical wound, inflammation inside the eye, and retinal detachments. There is also a risk of bacterial infection from the implanted cables that connect the implant to the signal processor.

== Surgical procedure ==
The implantation procedure takes several hours, with the person receiving the implant under general anaesthesia. The surgeon removes the vitreous humor and any membranes on the retina where the implant will be placed. The implant is attached to the surface of the retina with a tack. The cables connecting the implant to the processor are run through the pars plana, a region near where the iris and sclera touch.

== Device ==
The Argus implant's primary external element is a digital camera mounted on eyeglass frames, which obtains images of the user's surroundings; signals from the camera are transmitted wirelessly to a computerised image processor. The processor is in turn connected by cables to the implant itself, which is surgically implanted on the surface of the person's retina and tacked into place. The implant consists of 60 electrodes, each 200 microns in diameter.

The resolution of the 6 dot by 10 dot rectangular grid image (produced by the 6 by 10 array of 60 electrodes, of which 55 are enabled) in a person's vision is very low relative to normal visual acuity. This allows visual detection of edges of large areas of high contrast, such as door frames and sidewalks, to give the individual the capability to navigate in their environment more safely.

== History ==
The implant's manufacturer, Second Sight Medical Products, was founded in Sylmar, California, in 1998, by Alfred Mann, Samuel Williams, and Gunnar Bjorg. Williams, an investor in a cochlear implant company operated by Mann, approached Mann about founding a company to develop a similar product for the eye, and Mann called a meeting with the two of them and Robert Greenberg, who worked at Mann's foundation. Greenberg had previously worked on retinal prosthetics as a graduate student at Johns Hopkins University, wrote the business plan, and was appointed as CEO of the new company when it was launched. Greenberg led the company as CEO through 2015 (and was chairman of the board through 2018). The first version of the prosthesis, the Argus I, was clinically tested on six people starting in 2002. The second version, the Argus II, was designed to be smaller and easier to implant, and was co-invented by Mark Humayun of the USC Eye Institute, who had been involved in the clinical testing of the Argus I. The Argus II was first tested in Mexico in 2006, and then a 30-person clinical trial was conducted in 10 medical centers across Europe and the United States.

== Society and culture ==
=== Regulatory status ===
The Argus II received approval for commercial use in the European Union in March 2011. In February 2013, the FDA approved the Argus II under a humanitarian device exemption, authorizing its use for up to 4,000 people in the US per year.

=== Pricing and insurance ===
The Argus II was initially available at a limited number of clinics in France, Germany, Italy, the Netherlands, the United Kingdom and Saudi Arabia, at an EU market price of US$115,000. When the Argus II launched in the United States in February 2013, Second Sight announced that it would be priced at around $150,000, excluding the cost of surgery and usage training. In August 2013, Second Sight announced that reimbursement payments had been approved for the Argus II for blind Medicare recipients in the United States.

== Research ==
A trial in England funded by NHS England for ten patients began in 2017.

== Aftermath ==
In 2020, Second Sight stopped providing technical support for the Argus, as well as for the successor device, Argus II, and for the brain implant, Orion; an investigation by IEEE Spectrum revealed that users risk – and in some cases, have already experienced – a return to blindness. Second Sight merged with Nano Precision Medical in August 2023 with a commitment to provide technical support for the Argus II.

== See also ==
- Bionic contact lens
