= USC Eye Institute =

USC Gayle and Edward Roski Eye Institute

Geography
- Location: Los Angeles, California, United States
- Coordinates: 34.06161°N 118.20233°W

Organization
- Type: Teaching
- Affiliated university: University of Southern California; USC Keck School of Medicine

Services
- Speciality: Ophthalmology

Links
- Website: www.keckmedicine.org/services/eye/
- Lists: Hospitals in California

The USC Gayle and Edward Roski Eye Institute, part of Keck School of Medicine of USC, is a center for ophthalmic care, research and education located in downtown Los Angeles, California. It has subsidiary clinics in Pasadena, Beverly Hills and Arcadia. It was allied with the Doheny Eye Institute from 1975 until 2013, when Doheny allied with University of California Los Angeles.

== History ==
Ophthalmology at the Keck School of Medicine of USC attained departmental status in 1974 and opened its first building on the USC Health Sciences Campus in 1975. Although an ophthalmology residency program existed at USC prior to that time, there were no full-time faculty members in the department. Stephen J. Ryan was recruited in 1974 and served as the department’s first professor and chairman through 1995. In 1975, the Doheny Eye Institute allied with USC's Ophthalmology department under Ryan and relocated to the USC campus. The alliance "provided Dr. Ryan the opportunity to recruit and build the institute’s department from the ground up. Thus began the transformation of the institute into one of the top university based ophthalmic teaching, clinical, and research centers....Dr. Ryan built Doheny into a respected institution. In 2011 alone, Doheny scientists received $21.8 million in federal and state grants and published more than 180 scientific papers." All of the Doheny Eye Institute's doctors were appointed as USC faculty members.

The Doheny Eye Institute built a new building on USC's campus in 1985 to provide clinical facilities for USC's ophthalmology faculty.

In 2011, USC and the Doheny Eye Institute fell into a dispute over renovations, permits, and other matters related to the building, which led to litigation.

In 2013, the Doheny Eye Institute ended its relationship with USC and entered into an exclusive, long-term affiliation with University of California Los Angeles

Ronald E. Smith served as department chairman from 1995 to 2013, and left USC to follow Doheny, and became vice chair of the department at UCLA.

Mark S. Humayun took over as chair of the Department of Ophthalmology at the Keck School of Medicine of USC in November 2013, and in February 2014, Rohit Varma was appointed director of the USC Eye Institute.

In April 2016 it received a $25 million gift from Edward P. Roski and his wife, Gayle, and was renamed in their honor.

== Research ==
Members of the Institute have made contributions to vision research, some prior to arriving at USC such as two of the inventors of optical coherence tomography, Carmen A. Puliafito (as of 2007, Dean of the Keck School of Medicine) and David Huang, who did his residency at USC.

Dr. Mark Humayun, who joined the faculty of the Keck School of Medicine of USC in 2001, was a co-inventor of a retinal prosthesis that became the basis for the formation of the company, Second Sight, in 1998. Their first-generation implant had 16 electrodes and was implanted in 6 subjects by Humayun at University of Southern California between 2002 and 2004; Humayan has participated in subsequent clinical trials as well.

Ophthalmologist George Baerveldt, while he was at USC, developed the most commonly used glaucoma implant in the world, the Baerveldt glaucoma implant.

In December 2013, David Hinton and Mark S. Humayun won a $19 million grant from the California Institute for Regenerative Medicine to conduct a clinical trial in which the use of embryonic stem cells to treat age-related macular degeneration will be tested.

== U.S. News & World Report ==
In 2014-15, USC Eye Institute and USC Department of Ophthalmology retained the No. 9 spot in the national rankings of “Best Hospitals” by U.S. News & World Report. The faculty of the USC Department of Ophthalmology has earned Top 10 recognition by the magazine for 20 years.
