= Encrypting PIN pad =

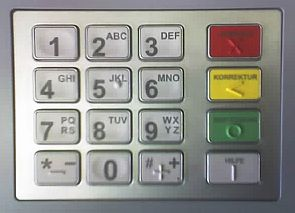
An ATM encrypting PIN pad (EPP) with German markings

An encrypting PIN pad is an apparatus for encrypting an identifier such as a PIN entered on a keypad. These are used in automated teller machines to ensure that the unencrypted PIN is not stored or transmitted anywhere in the rest of the system and thus cannot be revealed accidentally or through manipulations of the system.

== Apparatus ==
The apparatus includes a keypad, an encrypting circuit that is adjacent the pad, and a link coupling the pad and the encrypting circuit. The pad is for entering an identifier, and the circuit for encrypting the entered identifier. The pad may be a physical touch pad such as an N-wire technology touch pad. Alternatively, the pad may be a virtual touch screen. The encrypting circuit may be a CPU along with a memory coupled to the CPU and programmed to encrypt. The CPU and programmed memory may be the first CPU programmable to encrypt the entered identifier, through which the identifier passes. The encrypting circuit may be a micro controller programmed to encrypt. In still another variation, the encrypting circuit may be an application-specific integrated circuit (ASIC). The apparatus may include a housing that encloses the encrypting circuit and link. The housing would be resistant to access, tampering or tapping. The housing may be at least partially of chip-on-glass technology. The encrypting circuit may be embedded in the housing, as may the link. A method for encrypting an identifier includes placing a pad for entering an identifier, a circuit for encrypting an identifier and a link communicative coupling the pad and the circuit adjacent in an access-resistant housing. An identifier is entered on the pad and communicated to the encrypting circuit. The encrypting circuit encrypts the identifier. The encrypted identifier may be forwarded for verification.
