= Bad City (disambiguation) =

Bad City was a five-piece rock band from Chicago, Illinois.

Bad City may also refer to:

- Bad City, a Japanese film starring Akane Sakanoue
- Bad City: Peril and Power in the City of Angels, a nonfiction book written by Paul Pringle
