= False eye =

False eye may refer to:

- Ocular prosthesis
- Bionic eye
- An intersection in the game of Go that appears safe but can be taken. See Go (board game)
- Eyespot, a pattern of feathers, scales or skin pigmentation that looks like an eye
