= Displair =

3D interactive raster display technology

Displair is a 3D interactive raster display technology developed by a Russian company of the same name. The Displair projects images onto sheets of water droplets suspended in air, giving the illusion of a hologram. Unlike other cold fog projecting technologies, the images projected by the Displair can also respond rapidly to multi-touch manipulation, as well as allowing taste and aroma to be incorporated.

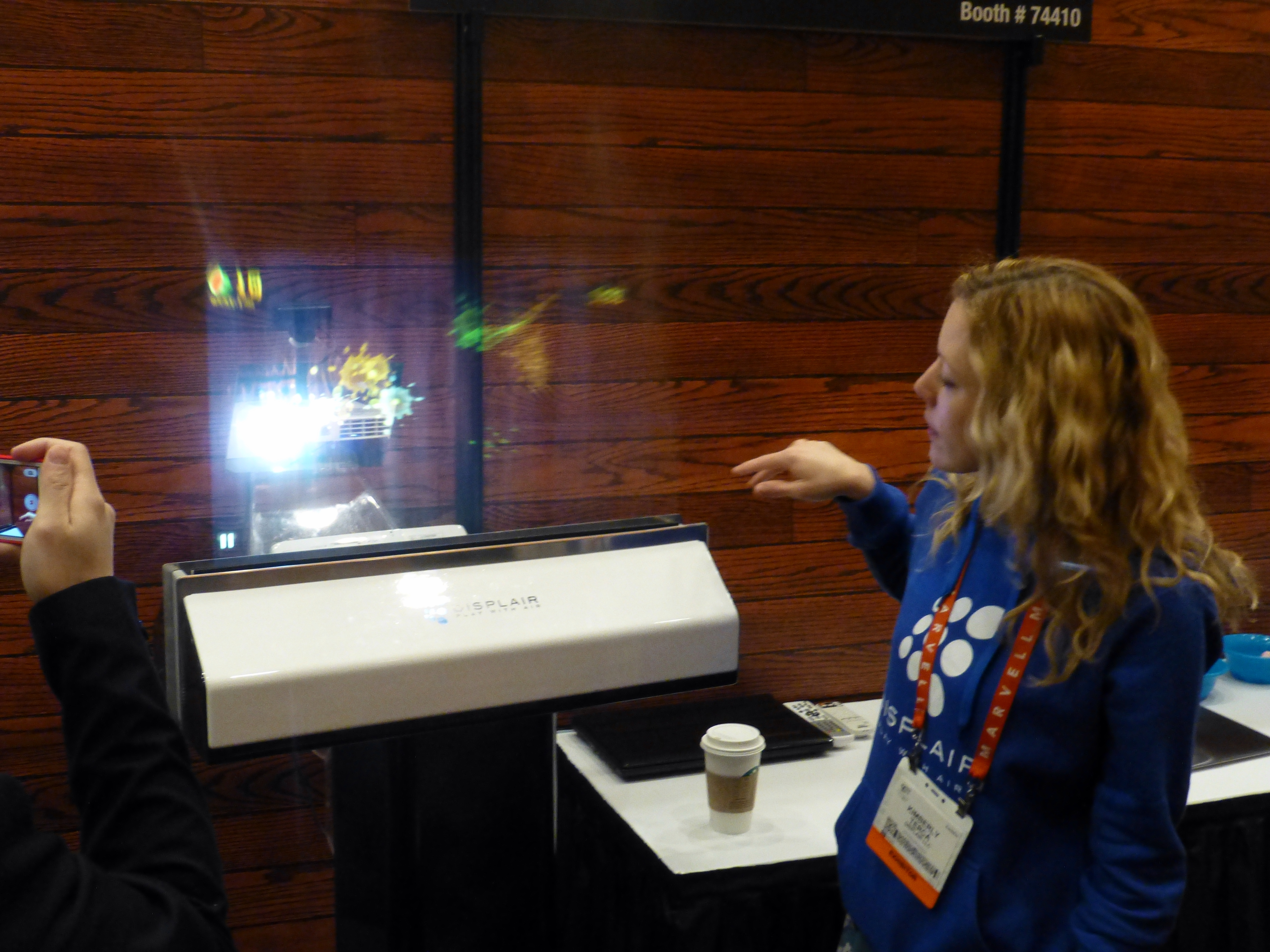
Russian-made Displair screenless 3D multi-touch display being demonstrated at the Consumer Electronics Show (CES) 2013, Las Vegas

== History ==
Developer Maxim Kamanin introduced the Displair at Seliger 2010. In July of that year he chose the "Displair" name for both the product and the company as a portmanteau of the English words "display" and "air". The company subsequently obtained investment for further development of the prototype, technology licensing, and small-scale commercial production. Applications to date have included displays for in-store advertising and kiosks.

== Technology ==
The Displair device projects still and moving images onto a "screenless" display consisting of cold stable air flow containing particles of water produced by a cavitation method. These particles are small enough not to leave traces of moisture, and their surface tension high enough to maintain stability after contact with physical objects and wind.

Displair uses third party computerised multi-touch technologies to allow control of images with fingers or with other objects. The display can work with up to 1500 touch points simultaneously with a delay time of less than 0.2 seconds. This makes it possible to allow manipulation by more than one user, and also to identify more complex gestures than similar 3D display systems. The company is working on incorporating flavoring and taste interaction with projected images in the future.

== See also ==
- Fog display
- Screenless video
- Virtual retinal display
