= Google Contact Lens =

Smart contact lens project

Google Contact Lens was a smart contact lens project announced by Google on January 16, 2014. The project aimed to assist people with diabetes by constantly measuring the glucose levels in their tears. The project was being carried out by Verily and as of 2014 was being tested using prototypes. On November 16, 2018, Verily announced it had discontinued the project.

== Design ==
The lens consisted of a Wireless chip and a miniaturized glucose sensor. A tiny pinhole in the lens allows tear fluid to seep into the sensor, which measures blood sugar levels. Both of the sensors embedded between two soft layers of lens material. The electronics lie outside of both the pupil and the iris, so there was no damage to the eye. There was a wireless antenna inside the contact, thinner than a human hair, which served as a controller, communicating information to the wireless device. The controller gathered, read, and analyzed data sent to the external device via the antenna. Power was drawn from the device, which communicated data via the wireless technology RFID. There was plans to add small LED lights that warned the wearer by lighting up when the glucose levels have crossed above or below certain thresholds. The performance of the contact lenses in windy environments and teary eyes was unknown.

The tested prototypes generated a reading once per second.

== Announcements ==
On January 16, 2014, Google announced that, for the past 18 months, they had been working on a contact lens that could help people with diabetes by continually checking their glucose levels. The idea was originally funded by the National Science Foundation and was first brought to Microsoft. The product was created by Brian Otis and Babak Parviz who were both members of the electrical engineering faculty at the University of Washington before working in Google's secret R&D organization, Google X. Google noted in their official announcement that scientists have long looked into how certain body fluids can help track glucose levels easier, but as tears are hard to collect and study, using them was never really an option. They also mentioned that the project is currently being discussed with the FDA while still noting that there is a lot more work left to do before the product can be released for general usage, which is said to happen in five years at best, and that they are looking for partners who would use the technology for the lens by developing apps that would make the measurements available to the wearers and their respective doctors. The partners would also be expected to use this research and technology to develop advanced medical and vision devices for future generations.

On July 15, 2014, Google announced a partnership with Novartis' Alcon unit to develop the glucose-sensing smart contact lens.

On November 16, 2018, Verily announced it had discontinued the project due to a lack of correlation between tear glucose and blood glucose.

== Response ==
Endocrinologist Dr. Larry Levin commented on the benefits of being able to offer his patients a pain-free alternative to either pricking their fingers or using a continuous glucose monitor.

Experts in the field also have cast doubt on the ability of the amount of glucose in tears (as measured by the contact lens) to correlate strongly with the user's blood glucose. Many reported studies show, at best, a weak correlation that would not meet accuracy requirements for glucose monitoring.

== See also ==
- Bionic contact lens
- Google Glass
