= Fog display =

A fog display, fog screen, vapor screen or vapor display is a system that uses haze machines or water vapor to create a semi-transparent wall, or "curtain" of suspended particles which trapped in a thin sheet (laminar flow) of air and are illuminated by a projector, in order to produce a display whose images seem to float in mid air. Several commercial systems exist, such as FogScreen, Displair and Heliodisplay. There is also an open-source variant being developed called Hoverlay II

This system can be expanded using multiple projectors to create a three-dimensional image, thus becoming a volumetric 3D display. Alternatively, a three-dimensional image can be produced using a single projector paired with a reconfigurable fog screen, which generates fog at variable depths and positions.

== See also ==
- Smoke and mirrors
