= Virtual retinal display =

Display technology

A diagram showing the workings of the virtual retinal display

A virtual retinal display (VRD), also known as a retinal scan display (RSD) or retinal projector (RP), is a proposed display technology that draws a raster display (like a television) directly onto the retina of the eye.

== History ==
In the past, similar systems have been made by projecting a defocused image directly in front of the user's eye on a small "screen", normally in the form of large glasses. The user focused their eyes on the background, where the screen appeared to be floating. The disadvantage of these systems was the limited area covered by the "screen", the high weight of the small televisions used to project the display, and the fact that the image would appear focused only if the user was focusing at a particular "depth". Limited brightness made them useful only in indoor settings as well.

Only recently a number of developments have made a true VRD system practical. In particular the development of high-brightness LEDs have made the displays bright enough to be used during the day, and adaptive optics have allowed systems to dynamically correct for irregularities in the eye (although this is not always needed). The result is a high-resolution screenless display with excellent color gamut and brightness, far better than the best television technologies.

The VRD was invented by Kazuo Yoshinaka of Nippon Electric Co. in 1986. Later work at the University of Washington in the Human Interface Technology Lab resulted in a similar system in 1991. Most of the research into VRDs to date has been in combination with various virtual reality systems. In this role VRDs have the potential advantage of being much smaller than existing television-based systems. They share some of the same disadvantages however, requiring some sort of optics to send the image into the eye, typically similar to the sunglasses system used with previous technologies. It also can be used as part of a wearable computer system.

A Washington-based startup, MicroVision, Inc., has sought to commercialize VRD. Founded in 1993, MicroVision's early development work was financed by US government defense contracts and resulted in the prototype head-mounted display called Nomad.

In 2018, Intel announced Vaunt, a set of smart glasses that are designed to appear like conventional glasses, which use retinal projection via a vertical-cavity surface-emitting laser and holographic grating. Intel gave up on this project, and sold the technology to North to be integrated into their Focals line until it — and its planned second generation release — was discontinued in 2020, following the Google's acquisition of the company.

Also in 2018, QD Laser, a Japanese laser maker spun off from Fujitsu, developed the first commercialized true VRD RETISSA Display. In the following year, the firm started to sell the successor VRD RETISSA Display II, which featured a higher resolution equivalent to 720p.

In 2023 Sony produced a compact camera with an integrated Retissa Neoviewer retinal projection device, for release in the US. The resolution of the retinal display only (not the camera) is claimed by the manufacturers to be nominally equivalent to 720P.

Although "not a medical device" it is hoped that the retinal projection viewer may be of particular value to some visually impaired users, and the adaptation was heavily subsidised by Sony. Because of the novel user experience, and limited availability, potential buyers were strongly encouraged to participate in "touch-and-try" events to see if the technology is useful to their particular circumstances before committing to a purchase.

== See also ==
- Augmented reality
- Bionic contact lens
- Google Glass
- Head-up display
- List of emerging technologies
- Magic Leap
- Optical head-mounted display
- Smartglasses
- Visual prosthetic
