= Paul Pringle =

American journalist

- Born: 1956 (age 69–70)
- Education: California State University, Northridge (BA); Pennsylvania State University (MA)
- Occupation: Investigative journalist
- Employer: Los Angeles Times
- Spouse: Joanna Pringle (m. 1985)

Paul Pringle (born 1956) is an American investigative journalist for the Los Angeles Times and author of the 2022 book Bad City: Peril and Power in the City of Angels.

== Education ==
Pringle earned a Bachelor of Arts degree in political science and journalism from California State University, Northridge in 1978 and a Master of Arts in journalism from Pennsylvania State University, where he was a columnist for The Daily Collegian.

== Career ==
Before joining the Los Angeles Times in 2001, Pringle worked as West Coast bureau chief for The Dallas Morning News from 1998 to 2001 and as Los Angeles bureau chief for Copley News Service from 1984 to 1998. He also worked as a stringer for The Tampa Tribune and taught journalism part-time at Cal State Northridge.

=== Los Angeles Times ===
Pringle is an investigative reporter at the Los Angeles Times. He has covered stories that include the 2004 California wildfires, corruption in the Service Employees International Union, misspending in Los Angeles's community colleges, corruption in Bell, California, abuses by the Coliseum Commission, drug use by former USC Keck School of Medicine Dean Carmen Puliafito and a subsequent lack of response by the Pasadena Police Department, and the alleged abuse of women by USC gynecologist George Tyndall.

His book, Bad City: Peril and Power in the City of Angels, is a behind-the-scenes look at his investigation into Puliafito and the consequent exposure of corruption at USC, the Pasadena Police Department, and the Los Angeles Times. The book was published by Celadon Books in 2022. It describes his year-long struggle to get the story of Puliafito's drug-fueled sexual activities published. Pringle's reporting on the case began with a March 2016 overdose incident, but his superiors at the Times refused to publish the story, because they did not want to offend USC. He and colleagues persisted, continuing to research the case, until the Times finally published the report in July 2017, long after Puliafito had resigned as dean. Katie Benner of The New York Times wrote that "Pringle’s fast-paced book is a master class in investigative journalism," adding "Pringle delivers his account in a torrent of sharp storytelling and righteous score-settling that might seem petty if the stakes were not so grave."

== Awards ==
- 2004 Pulitzer Prize for Breaking News Reporting for What Do You Save From a House Full of Memories?
- 2008 George Polk Award
- 2008 Distinguished Journalist, by the Greater Los Angeles chapter of the Society of Professional Journalists
- 2009 Pulitzer Prize for Investigative Reporting Finalist
- 2011 Pulitzer Prize for Public Service
- 2012 Harvard University's Worth Bingham Prize
- 2014 California Newspaper Publishers Association's 1st Amendment Award
- 2015 University of Florida's Joseph L. Brechner Award
- 2019 Pulitzer Prize for Investigative Reporting
- 2025 Luzerne County Arts & Entertainment Hall of Fame inductee
