= Rohit Varma =

Indian-American ophthalmologist

Academic background
- Education: University of Delhi (MD); Johns Hopkins University (MPH)

Academic work
- Discipline: Ophthalmology
- Institutions: University of Illinois; University of Southern California

Dean of the Keck School of Medicine of USC
- In office March 2016 – May 1, 2018
- Preceded by: Carmen Puliafito
- Succeeded by: Laura Mosqueda

Rohit Varma is an Indian-American ophthalmologist and professor of ophthalmology and preventive medicine. In 2014, he was named director of the USC Eye Institute and chairman of the Department of Ophthalmology for Keck School of Medicine of USC. In March 2016, Varma was named the interim dean of the Keck School of Medicine, and in November was named dean. In October 2017, USC announced that he stepped down as dean. In October 2018, Varma became the founding director of the Southern California Eyecare and Vision Research Institute.

Varma has studied eye diseases in minority populations and examined biological, genetic and lifestyle factors related to the risk of developing eye diseases, as well as their prevalence.

== Education ==
Varma earned his medical degree from the University of Delhi and a Master of Public Health from the Johns Hopkins School of Public Health. He completed an internal medicine internship at Union Memorial Hospital in Baltimore, a residency at the Wilmer Ophthalmological Institute at Johns Hopkins Hospital, and a glaucoma fellowship at the Wills Eye Hospital in Philadelphia.

== Career ==
In September 2012, Varma was appointed chair of the Department of Ophthalmology and Visual Sciences and associate dean for strategic planning at the University of Illinois College of Medicine. He spent two years at the Illinois Eye and Ear Infirmary and then returned to Keck School of Medicine of USC as chair of the Department of Ophthalmology and director of the USC Eye Institute. In 2014, he helped develop the Xen implant. The collagen-derived gelatin stent was a development on traditional glaucoma surgery, as it is said to be less invasive.

In February 2016, he was elected president of the clinical chairs of the Keck School of Medicine, succeeding John Niparko. In March 2016, Varma was named interim dean of the Keck School of Medicine of USC when Carmen Puliafito, who had been dean since 2007, resigned after reports were published regarding his use of methamphetamine. In November 2016, Varma was named dean. While dean, Varma launched an international expansion project. The Keck School obtained more than $140 million in National Institutes of Health grants during his tenure.

In October 2017 Varma stepped down as dean to join the faculty at USC after sexual harassment claims against him were uncovered. In July 2018, it was announced that Varma had joined the Board of Directors at Illusio, a medical software company bringing augmented reality technology into plastic surgery.

In October 2018, the Hollywood Presbyterian Medical Center announced Varma as the founding director of the Southern California Eyecare and Vision Research Institute (SCEVRI).

== Controversies ==
Dr. Rohit Varma has been associated with several controversies related to his professional conduct and leadership. In 2003, while a junior professor, he was formally disciplined by USC following findings that he had engaged in inappropriate behavior toward a young female researcher under his supervision. The university concluded there was sufficient evidence of sexual harassment and retaliation, imposed sanctions including a delayed promotion and salary reduction, and later reached a financial settlement with the researcher. Despite these findings, Varma remained on the faculty and was eventually promoted to senior leadership roles, including department chair and later dean. His appointment as dean in 2016 drew criticism from faculty and observers who questioned the university’s handling of past misconduct findings and transparency. In 2017, amid renewed scrutiny and media reporting on the earlier case, USC leadership stated it had lost confidence in his ability to lead, and Varma stepped down from the dean position.

== Research ==
Varma has studied eye diseases in minority populations and examined biological, genetic and lifestyle factors related to the risk of developing eye diseases. In 2000, Varma was part of the Los Angeles Latino Eye Study at the Doheny Eye Institute, with the National Eye Institute. In 2006, Varma published a paper in the American Journal of Ophthalmology, discussing diabetic retinopathy.

Varma's primary research has focused on epidemiologic studies of eye disease in children and aging populations. He was the principal investigator in the Los Angeles Latino Eye Study, the African-American Eye Disease Study, the Chinese-American Eye Study, and the Multi-Ethnic Pediatric Eye Diseases Study. MEPEDS is the largest study of childhood eye diseases ever undertaken in the U.S. In January 2016, the study confirmed that the incidence of childhood myopia among American children has more than doubled over the last 50 years. The findings echo a trend among adults and children in Asia, where 90% or more of the population have been diagnosed with myopia, up from 10% to 20% 60 years ago.

He has studied also changes in the optic nerve in glaucoma, and has helped develop imaging techniques that aid in the early diagnosis of glaucomatous optic nerve damage.

== Publications ==
Varma co-wrote two ophthalmic books: Essentials of Eye Care: The Johns Hopkins Wilmer Handbook; and The Optic Nerve in Glaucoma. Varma co-edited the book Advanced Glaucoma Surgery, published by Springer International Publishing in its Essentials in Ophthalmology series.

Varma has additionally published many articles in journals such as Glaucoma Today and Ophthalmology Times.
