= Retinal implant =

Visual prosthesis

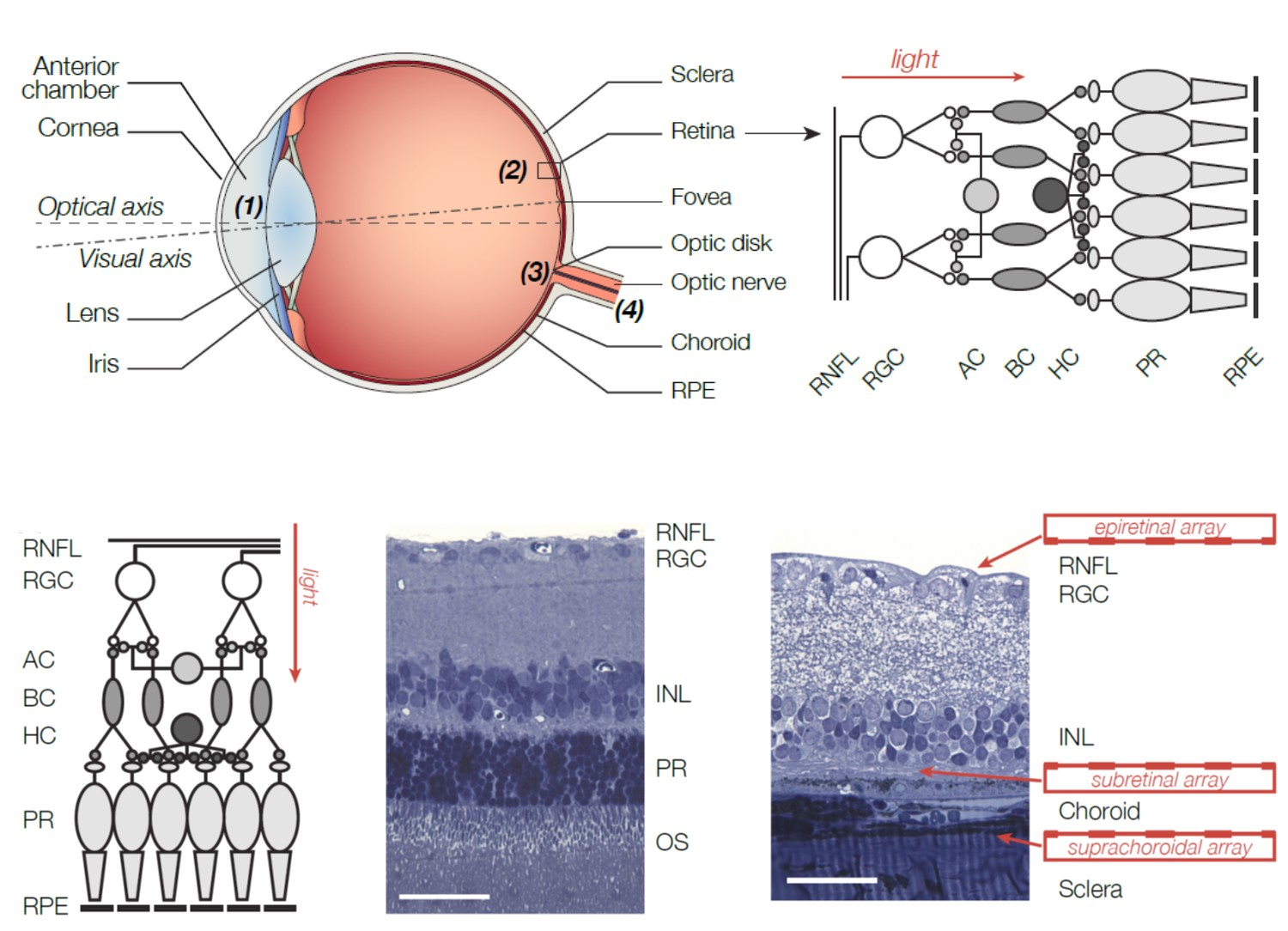
Diagram of the eye, the retina, and location of the various retinal implants. Retinal layers, from bottom to top: retinal pigment epithelium (RPE), photoreceptors (PR), horizontal cells (HC), bipolar cells (BC), amacrine cells (AC), ganglion cells (RGC), nerve fiber layer (RNFL).

A retinal implant is a visual prosthesis for restoration of sight to patients blinded by retinal degeneration. The system is meant to partially restore useful vision to those who have lost their photoreceptors due to retinal diseases such as retinitis pigmentosa (RP) or age-related macular degeneration (AMD). Retinal implants are being developed by a number of private companies and research institutions, and three types are in clinical trials: epiretinal (on the retina), subretinal (behind the retina), and suprachoroidal (between the choroid and the sclera). The implants introduce visual information into the retina by electrically stimulating the surviving retinal neurons. So far, elicited percepts had rather low resolution, and may be suitable for light perception and recognition of simple objects.

== History ==
Foerster was the first to discover that electrical stimulation of the occipital cortex could be used to create visual percepts, phosphenes. The first application of an implantable stimulator for vision restoration was developed by Drs. Brindley and Lewin in 1968. This experiment demonstrated the viability of creating visual percepts using direct electrical stimulation, and it motivated the development of several other implantable devices for stimulation of the visual pathway, including retinal implants. Retinal stimulation devices, in particular, have become a focus of research as approximately half of all cases of blindness are caused by retinal damage. The development of retinal implants has also been motivated in part by the advancement and success of cochlear implants, which has demonstrated that humans can regain significant sensory function with limited input.

The Argus II retinal implant, manufactured by Second Sight Medical Products received market approval in the US in Feb 2013 and in Europe in Feb 2011, becoming the first approved implant. The device may help adults with RP who have lost the ability to perceive shapes and movement to be more mobile and to perform day-to-day activities. The epiretinal device is known as the Retina Implant and was originally developed in Germany by Retina Implant AG. It completed a multi-centre clinical trial in Europe and was awarded a CE Mark in 2013, making it the first wireless epiretinal electronic device to gain approval.

== Candidates ==
Optimal candidates for retinal implants have retinal diseases, such as retinitis pigmentosa or age-related macular degeneration. These diseases cause blindness by affecting the photoreceptor cells in the outer layer of the retina, while leaving the inner and middle retinal layers intact. Minimally, a patient must have an intact ganglion cell layer in order to be a candidate for a retinal implant. This can be assessed non-invasively using optical coherence tomography (OCT) imaging. Other factors, including the amount of residual vision, overall health, and family commitment to rehabilitation, are also considered when determining candidates for retinal implants. In subjects with age-related macular degeneration, who may have intact peripheral vision, retinal implants could result in a hybrid form of vision. In this case the implant would supplement the remaining peripheral vision with central vision information.

== Types ==
There are two main types of retinal implants by placement. Epiretinal implants are placed in the internal surface of the retina, while subretinal implants are placed between the outer retinal layer and the retinal pigment epithelium.

=== Epiretinal implants ===
==== Design principles ====
Epiretinal implants are placed on top of the retinal surface, above the nerve fiber layer, directly stimulating ganglion cells and bypassing all other retinal layers. Array of electrodes is stabilized on the retina using micro tacks which penetrate into the sclera. Typically, external video camera on eyeglasses acquires images and transmits processed video information to the stimulating electrodes via wireless telemetry. An external transmitter is also required to provide power to the implant via radio-frequency induction coils or infrared lasers. The real-time image processing involves reducing the resolution, enhancing contrast, detecting the edges in the image and converting it into a spatio-temporal pattern of stimulation delivered to the electrode array on the retina. The majority of electronics can be incorporated into the associated external components, allowing for a smaller implant and simpler upgrades without additional surgery. The external electronics provides full control over the image processing for each patient.

==== Advantages ====
Epiretinal implants directly stimulate the retinal ganglion cells, thereby bypassing all other retinal layers. Therefore, in principle, epiretinal implants could provide visual perception to individuals even if all other retinal layers have been damaged.

==== Disadvantages ====
Since the nerve fiber layer has similar stimulation threshold to that of the retinal ganglion cells, axons passing under the epiretinal electrodes are stimulated, creating arcuate percepts, and thereby distorting the retinotopic map. So far, none of the epiretinal implants had light-sensitive pixels, and hence they rely on external camera for capturing the visual information. Therefore, unlike natural vision, eye movements do not shift the transmitted image on the retina, which creates a perception of the moving object when person with such an implant changes the direction of gaze. Therefore, patients with such implants are asked to not move their eyes, but rather scan the visual field with their head. Additionally, encoding visual information at the ganglion cell layer requires very sophisticated image processing techniques in order to account for various types of the retinal ganglion cells encoding different features of the image.

==== Clinical study ====
The first epiretinal implant, the ARGUS device, included a silicon platinum array with 16 electrodes. The Phase I clinical trial of ARGUS began in 2002 by implanting six participants with the device. All patients reported gaining a perception of light and discrete phosphenes, with the visual function of some patients improving significantly over time. Future versions of the ARGUS device are being developed with increasingly dense electrode arrays, allowing for improved spatial resolution. The most recent ARGUS II device contains 60 electrodes, and a 200 electrode device is under development by ophthalmologists and engineers at the USC Eye Institute. The ARGUS II device received marketing approval in February 2011 (CE Mark demonstrating safety and performance), and it is available in Germany, France, Italy, and UK. Interim results on 30 patients long term trials were published in Ophthalmology in 2012. Argus II received approval from the US FDA on April 14, 2013 FDA Approval. Another epiretinal device, the Learning Retinal Implant, has been developed by IIP technologies GmbH, and has begun to be evaluated in clinical trials. A third epiretinal device, EPI-RET, has been developed and progressed to clinical testing in six patients. The EPI-RET device contains 25 electrodes and requires the crystalline lens to be replaced with a receiver chip. All subjects have demonstrated the ability to discriminate between different spatial and temporal patterns of stimulation.

=== Subretinal implants ===
==== Design principles ====
Subretinal implants sit on the outer surface of the retina, between the photoreceptor layer and the retinal pigment epithelium, directly stimulating retinal cells and relying on the normal processing of the inner and middle retinal layers. Adhering a subretinal implant in place is relatively simple, as the implant is mechanically constrained by the minimal distance between the outer retina and the retinal pigment epithelium. A subretinal implant consists of a silicon wafer containing light sensitive microphotodiodes, which generate signals directly from the incoming light. Incident light passing through the retina generates currents within the microphotodiodes, which directly inject the resultant current into the underlying retinal cells via arrays of microelectrodes. The pattern of microphotodiodes activated by incident light therefore stimulates a pattern of bipolar, horizontal, amacrine, and ganglion cells, leading to a visual perception representative of the original incident image. In principle, subretinal implants do not require any external hardware beyond the implanted microphotodiodes array. However, some subretinal implants require power from external circuitry to enhance the image signal.

==== Advantages ====
A subretinal implant is advantageous over an epiretinal implant in part because of its simpler design. The light acquisition, processing, and stimulation are all carried out by microphotodiodes mounted onto a single chip, as opposed to the external camera, processing chip, and implanted electrode array associated with an epiretinal implant. The subretinal placement is also more straightforward, as it places the stimulating array directly adjacent to the damaged photoreceptors. By relying on the function of the remaining retinal layers, subretinal implants allow for normal inner retinal processing, including amplification, thus resulting in an overall lower threshold for a visual response. Additionally, subretinal implants enable subjects to use normal eye movements to shift their gaze. The retinotopic stimulation from subretinal implants is inherently more accurate, as the pattern of incident light on the microphotodiodes is a direct reflection of the desired image. Subretinal implants require minimal fixation, as the subretinal space is mechanically constrained and the retinal pigment epithelium creates negative pressure within the subretinal space.

==== Disadvantages ====
The main disadvantage of subretinal implants is the lack of sufficient incident light to enable the microphotodiodes to generate adequate current. Thus, subretinal implants often incorporate an external power source to amplify the effect of incident light. The compact nature of the subretinal space imposes significant size constraints on the implant. The close proximity between the implant and the retina also increases the possibility of thermal damage to the retina from heat generated by the implant. Subretinal implants require intact inner and middle retinal layers, and therefore are not beneficial for retinal diseases extending beyond the outer photoreceptor layer. Additionally, photoreceptor loss can result in the formation of a membrane at the boundary of the damaged photoreceptors, which can impede stimulation and increase the stimulation threshold.

==== Clinical studies ====
Optobionics was the first company to develop a subretinal implant and evaluate the design in a clinical trial. Initial reports indicated that the implantation procedure was safe, and all subjects reported some perception of light and mild improvement in visual function. The current version of this device has been implanted in 10 patients, who have each reported improvements in the perception of visual details, including contrast, shape, and movement. Retina Implant AG in Germany has also developed a subretinal implant, which has undergone clinical testing in nine patients. Trial was put on hold due to repeated failures. The Retina Implant AG device contains 1500 microphotodiodes, allowing for increased spatial resolution, but requires an external power source. Retina implant AG reported 12 months results on the Alpha IMS study in February 2013 showing that six out of nine patients had a device failure in the nine months post implant Proceedings of the royal society B, and that five of the eight subjects reported various implant-mediated visual perceptions in daily life. One had optic nerve damage and did not perceive stimulation. The Boston Subretinal Implant Project has also developed several iterations of a functional subretinal implant, and focused on short term analysis of implant function. Results from all clinical trials to date indicate that patients receiving subretinal implants report perception of phosphenes, with some gaining the ability to perform basic visual tasks, such as shape recognition and motion detection.

== Spatial resolution ==
The quality of vision expected from a retinal implant is largely based on the maximum spatial resolution of the implant. Current prototypes of retinal implants are capable of providing low resolution, pixelated images.

"State-of-the-art" retinal implants incorporate 60-100 channels, sufficient for basic object discrimination and recognition tasks. However, simulations of the resultant pixelated images assume that all electrodes on the implant are in contact with the desired retinal cell; in reality the expected spatial resolution is lower, as a few of the electrodes may not function optimally. Tests of reading performance indicated that a 60-channel implant is sufficient to restore some reading ability, but only with significantly enlarged text. Similar experiments evaluating room navigation ability with pixelated images demonstrated that 60 channels were sufficient for experienced subjects, while naïve subjects required 256 channels. This experiment, therefore, not only demonstrated the functionality provided by low resolution visual feedback, but also the ability for subjects to adapt and improve over time. However, these experiments are based merely on simulations of low resolution vision in normal subjects, rather than clinical testing of implanted subjects. The number of electrodes necessary for reading or room navigation may differ in implanted subjects, and further testing needs to be conducted within this clinical population to determine the required spatial resolution for specific visual tasks.

Simulation results indicate that 600-1000 electrodes would be required to enable subjects to perform a wide variety of tasks, including reading, face recognition, and navigating around rooms. Thus, the available spatial resolution of retinal implants needs to increase by a factor of 10, while remaining small enough to implant, to restore sufficient visual function for those tasks. It is worth to note high-density stimulation is not equal to high visual acuity (resolution), which requires a lot of factors in both hardware (electrodes and coatings) and software (stimulation strategies based on surgical results).

== Current status and future developments ==
Clinical reports to date have demonstrated mixed success, with all patients report at least some sensation of light from the electrodes, and a smaller proportion gaining more detailed visual function, such as identifying patterns of light and dark areas. The clinical reports indicate that, even with low resolution, retinal implants are potentially useful in providing crude vision to individuals who otherwise would not have any visual sensation. However, clinical testing in implanted subjects is somewhat limited and the majority of spatial resolution simulation experiments have been conducted in normal controls. It remains unclear whether the low level vision provided by current retinal implants is sufficient to balance the risks associated with the surgical procedure, especially for subjects with intact peripheral vision. Several other aspects of retinal implants need to be addressed in future research, including the long term stability of the implants and the possibility of retinal neuron plasticity in response to prolonged stimulation.

The Manchester Royal Infirmary and Prof Paulo E Stanga announced on July 22, 2015, the first successful implantation of Second Sight's Argus II in patients with severe Age Related Macular Degeneration. These results are very impressive as it appears that the patients integrate the residual vision and the artificial vision. It potentially opens the use of retinal implants to millions of patients with AMD.

== See also ==
- Retinal regeneration
