= Photovoltaic retinal prosthesis =

Sight restoration technique

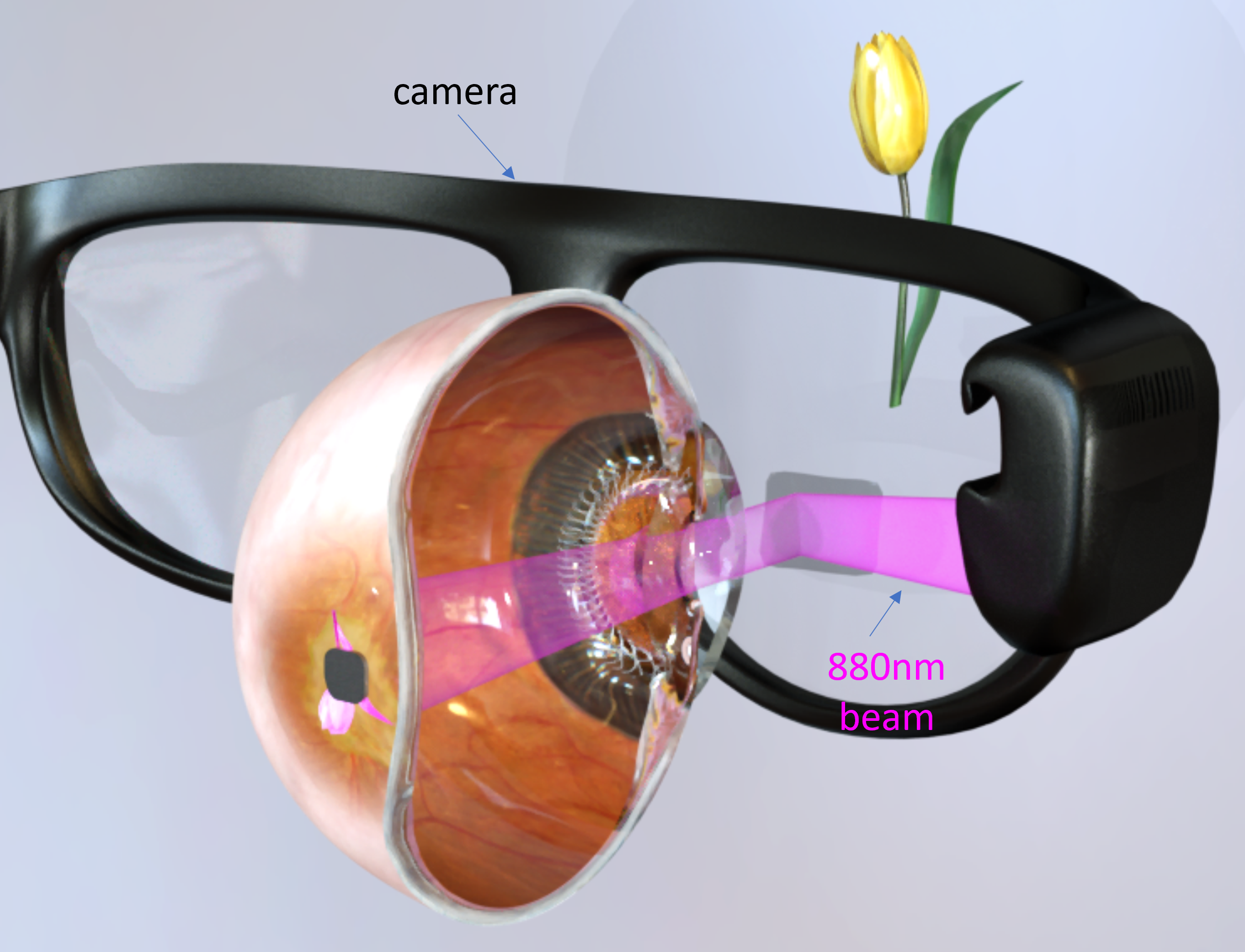
Images captured by the camera are processed and projected onto the subretinal photovoltaic implant from the augmented-reality glasses using near-IR (880nm) light

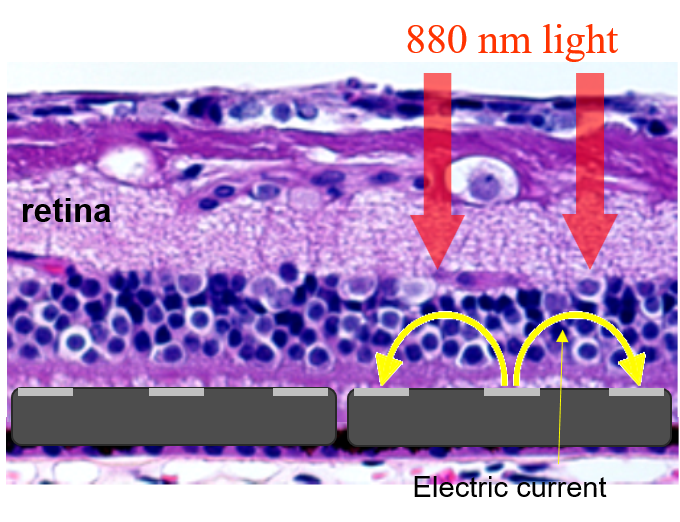
Photovoltaic array implanted under the degenerate retina converts NIR light into electric current flowing through the tissue and stimulating the inner retinal neurons.

Photovoltaic retinal prosthesis is a technology for restoration of sight to patients blinded by degenerative retinal diseases, such as retinitis pigmentosa and age-related macular degeneration (AMD), when patients lose the 'image capturing' photoreceptors, but neurons in the 'image-processing' inner retinal layers are relatively well-preserved. This subretinal prosthesis is designed to restore sight by electrically stimulating the surviving inner retinal neurons, primarily the bipolar cells. Photovoltaic retinal implants are wireless and powered by near-infrared illumination (880 nm) projected from the augmented-reality (AR) glasses. Lack of trans-scleral cable greatly simplifies the implantation procedure compared to other retinal implants. Images captured by a camera on the AR glasses are processed and projected onto the retinal implant. Each pixel converts this light into electric current flowing through the retina and stimulating the nearby retinal neurons. Optical activation of the photovoltaic pixels allows scaling the implants to thousands of electrodes and retains natural coupling of the eye movements to visual perception. Preclinical studies demonstrated that prosthetic vision with such subretinal implants preserves many features of natural vision, including flicker fusion at high frequencies (>20 Hz), adaptation to static images, antagonistic center-surround organization and non-linear summation of subunits in receptive fields, providing high spatial resolution.

Clinical trials with the first-generation of such implants (PRIMA, Science Corporation, former Pixium Vision) having 100μm pixels demonstrated that AMD patients perceive letters and other patterns with spatial resolution closely matching the pixel size (20/420). Moreover, central prosthetic vision is perceived simultaneously with the remaining natural peripheral vision. Using electronic zoom, patients can read much smaller fonts – down to equivalent acuity of 20/63, with the average improvement of visual acuity by 5 lines on ETDRS chart, compared to baseline.

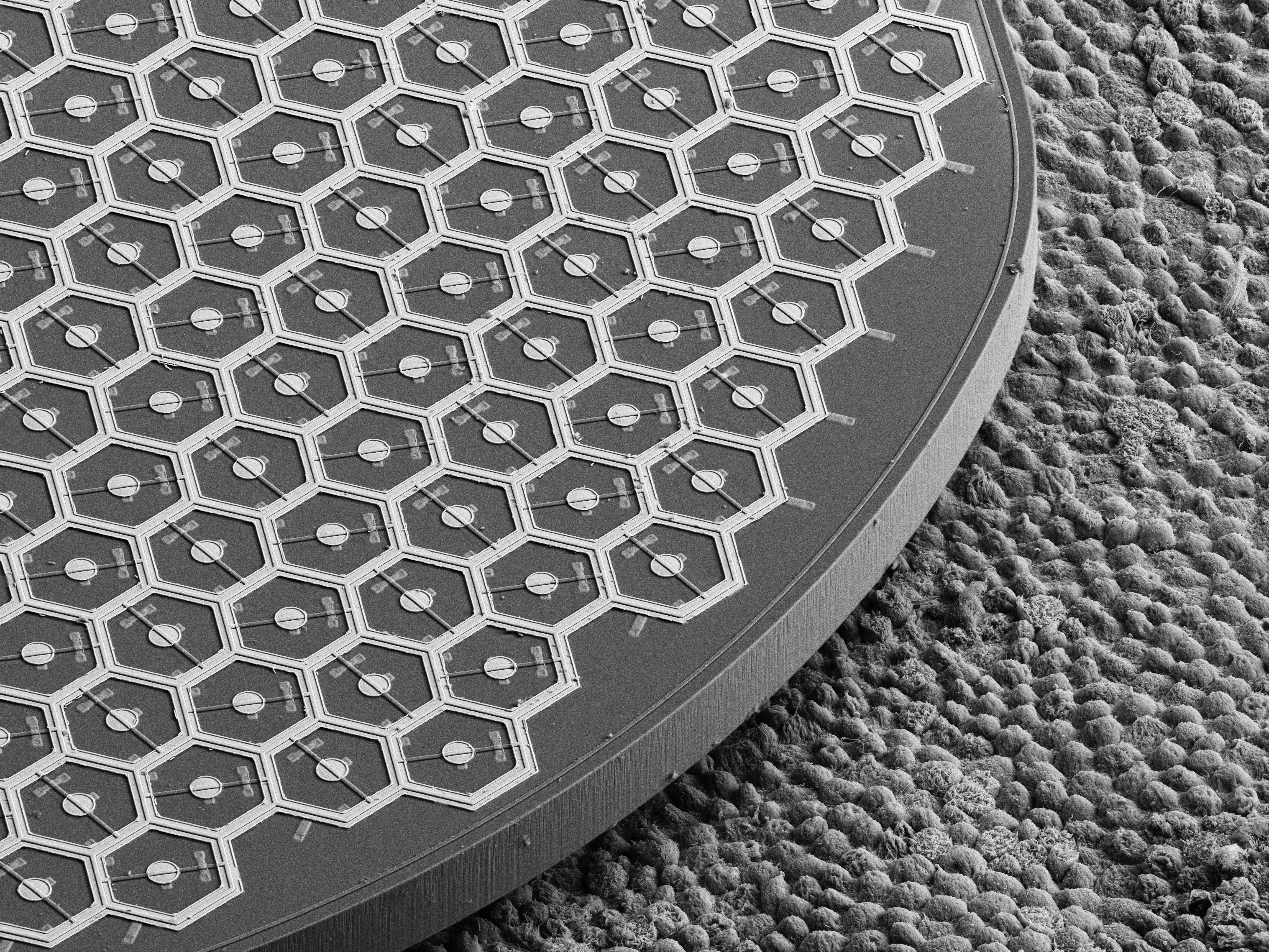
Photovoltaic array with 40μm pixels imaged on top of the retinal pigment epithelium.

The next-generation implants with 20μm pixels provided grating acuity matching the natural limit of resolution in rats (28μm). Currently, such high-resolution implants are being optimized for human retina by Palanker group at Stanford University. If successful in clinical trials, this pixel size may provide visual acuity up to 20/80 without zoom, and up to 20/20 with zoom.
