= Bad City: Peril and Power in the City of Angels =

2022 book by Paul Pringle

- 2022 Book jacket
- Author: Paul Pringle
- Subject: Puliafito, Carmen A., 1951---Drug use. Social Science / Sociology / General. University of Southern California. Corruption. Drug abuse. Investigative reporting. Universities and colleges -- Corrupt practices. California -- Los Angeles.
- Genre: nonfiction
- Set in: 2016, 2017 Greater Los Angeles and Pasadena, California
- Publisher: Celadon Books
- Publication date: July 2022
- Publication place: United States
- Pages: 350+
- ISBN: 9781250824080
- OCLC: 1295618982
- Dewey Decimal: 362.2909794/94
- LC Class: HV5833.L67 P75 2022
- Website: Macmillan Publishers

Bad City: Peril and Power in the City of Angels is a nonfiction book written by Paul Pringle. It is based on investigative reporting by a team of Los Angeles Times reporters, which included Pringle, as they cover University of Southern California and Los Angeles Times cover-ups and scandals. The book was released by Celadon Books on July 19, 2022.

== Synopsis ==
Bad City is a behind-the-scenes look at Pringle's investigation into Carmen Puliafito and the consequent exposure of corruption by the University of Southern California (USC), the Pasadena Police Department, and the Los Angeles Times. The book describes his year-long struggle to publish the story of Puliafito's drug-fueled sexual activities. Pringle's reporting on the case began with a March 2016 overdose incident, but his superiors at the Times refused to publish the story, because they did not want to offend USC. He and colleagues persisted, continuing to research the case, until the Times finally published the report in July 2017, long after Puliafito had resigned as dean.

== Reception ==
Katie Benner of The New York Times said that "Pringle's fast-paced book is a master class in investigative journalism," adding "Pringle delivers his account in a torrent of sharp storytelling and righteous score-settling that might seem petty if the stakes were not so grave." Kirkus Reviews called the book "a brisk chronicle of sex, lies, and betrayal." The book review website The Pequod rated the book 7.0 (out of 10.0), saying "Pringle's story hums along with an impressive sort of craftsmanship, driven in large part by his very detailed account of interviews, internal Times meetings, public records requests, and other developments in the case."
