= George Baerveldt =

American ophthalmologist

George Baerveldt was an American ophthalmologist who was a professor at the University of California, Irvine School of Medicine.

Baerveldt developed and held four patents related to the Baerveldt Glaucoma Implant, a device for the drainage of excess fluid from the eye in complex cases of glaucoma.

Baerveldt was also one of the inventors of the Trabectome, a device for minimally-invasive glaucoma surgery.

Baerveldt died on April 13, 2021, while recuperating from vascular surgery.
