= Screenless video =

Transmission of video without the use of a screen

Screenless video is any system for transmitting visual information from a video source without the use of a screen. Screenless computing systems can be divided into three groups: Visual Image, Retinal Direct, and Synaptic Interface.

== Visual image ==
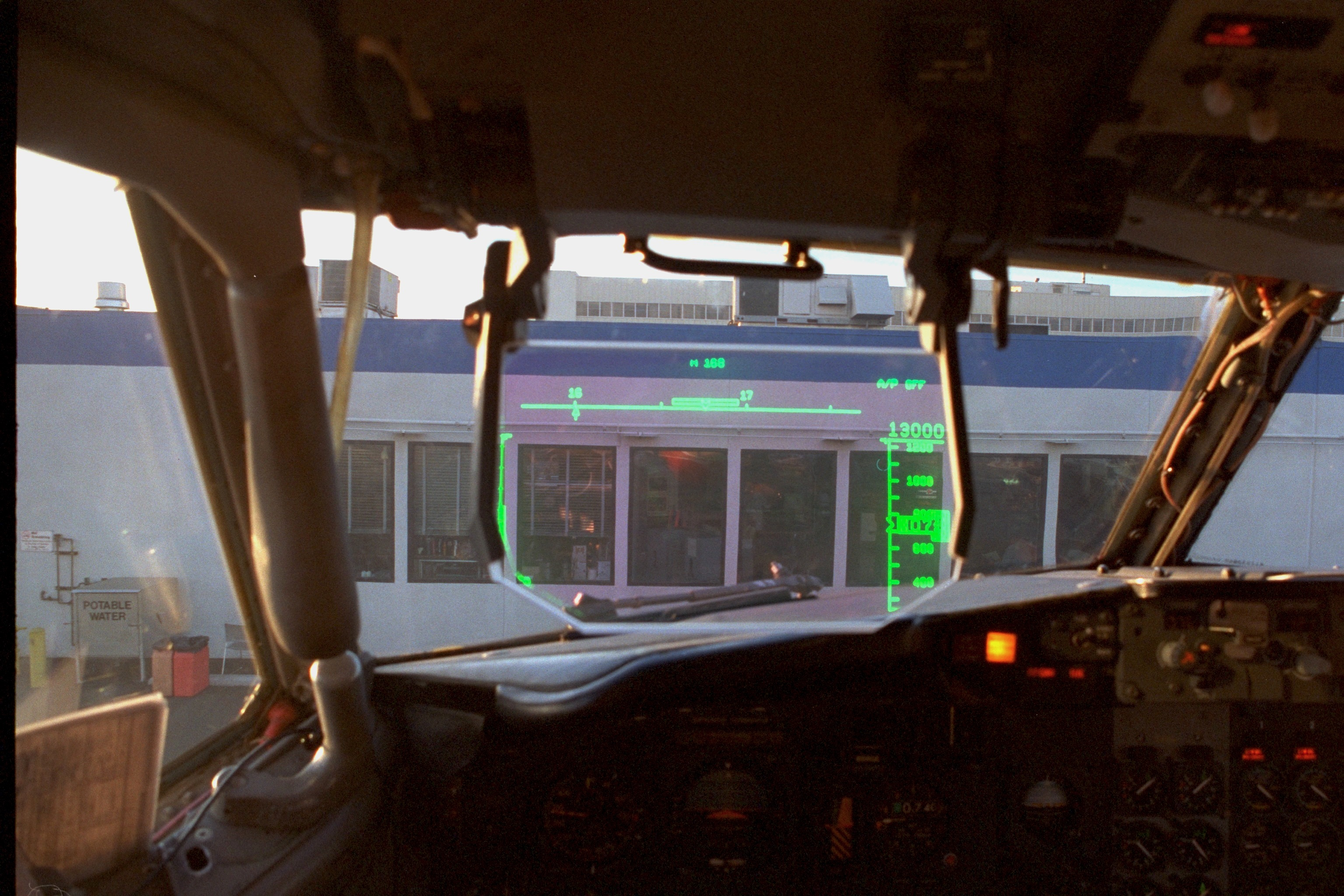
A heads up display reflected on cockpit glass

Visual Image screenless display includes any image that the eye can perceive. The most common example of Visual Image screenless display is a hologram. In these cases, light is reflected off some intermediate object (hologram, LCD panel, or cockpit window) before it reaches the retina. In the case of LCD panels the light is refracted from the back of the panel, but is nonetheless a reflected source. Google has proposed a similar system to replace the screens of tablet computers and smartphones.

== Retinal display ==
Virtual retinal display systems are a class of screenless displays in which images are projected directly onto the retina. They are distinguished from visual image systems because light is not reflected from some intermediate object onto the retina, it is instead projected directly onto the retina. Retinal Direct systems, once marketed, hold out the promise of extreme privacy when computing work is done in public places because most snooping relies on viewing the same light as the person who is legitimately viewing the screen, and retinal direct systems send light only into the pupils of their intended viewer.

== Synaptic interface ==
Synaptic Interface screenless video does not use light at all. Visual information completely bypasses the eye and is transmitted directly to the brain. While such systems have only been implemented in humans in rudimentary form - for example, displaying single Braille characters to blind people – success has been achieved in sampling usable video signals from the biological eyes of a living horseshoe crab through their optic nerves, and in sending video signals from electronic cameras into the creatures' brains using the same method.

== See also ==
- Volumetric display
- Fog display
- Augmented reality
