= Heliodisplay =

Air-based display

The Heliodisplay is an air-based display that uses water condensed from the air already present in the operating environment. The system, developed by IO2 Technology in 2001, uses a projection unit focused onto multiple layers of air and micron-sized atomized particles in midair, resulting in a two-dimensional display with no visible projection surface. This is similar in principle to the cinematic technique of rear projection. As dark areas of the image may appear invisible, the image may be more realistic than on a projection screen, although it is not volumetric. The system may be viewed from both front and back when combined with two light sources, but an oblique viewing angle of ±30 degrees may be required for various configurations due to the rear-projection requirement.

The Heliodisplay can operate as a free-space touchscreen, with the "i" models containing an embedded processor to detect touches without the IR laser grid that previous models required. Beginning with the original 2001 prototype, the Heliodisplay could be used as a pointing device if the supplied software was installed.

The air-based system is formed by a series of metal plates, and the original Heliodisplay could run for several hours, although newer models can operate continuously. The 2008 models of Heliodisplays use 80 ml to 120 ml of water per hour (mostly used for cooling), depending on screen size and user settings, although the medium is primarily air. The Heliodisplay works predominantly by drawing in the surrounding air (such as in museum environments), where there is a negligible effect on the surrounding space.

The Heliodisplay was invented by Chad Dyner, who built it as a five-inch interactive prototype in 2000–2001 before patenting the free-space display technology. The original system used a CMOS camera and an IR laser to track the position of a finger in mid-air and update the projected image to enable the first co-located display with mid-air control interface. IO2 Technology commercialized the original versions and made improvements over the years in developing the product line. The Heliodisplay is sold directly worldwide by IO2 Technology, which has offices in the Bay Area of Northern California.

== Models ==
=== M1 ===
The original M1 units produced by IO2 were advanced prototypes and proof-of-concept. Showcased in 2003, these are the first Heliodisplays developed by the IO2 Technology. They have all the above properties, but they have less fidelity than the future systems, although they adopted various ion-discharge plates. This first-generation Heliodisplay supported a 22” image and utilized an IR light source and an IR camera to track the position of a finger for controlling the cursor within the image.

=== M2 ===
The second-generation M2 Heliodisplay supports a 30-inch image with 16.7 million colors and a 2000:1 contrast ratio. The interactive M2i version includes virtual touchscreen capability.

=== M3 and M30 ===
The new third-generation M3 version launched on February 28, 2007 has the same basic specifications as the M2 but is said to be much quieter, with improved brightness and clarity, and more stable operation with an improved tri-flow system.

Apart from displaying at a standard ratio of 4:3, it also displays a 16:9 widescreen ratio. There is also an interactive version called the M3i.

The M30 is the updated version of the M3, which fits into the current model numbering system, 30 designating the diagonal screen size.

=== M50 and M100 ===
In late 2007, IO2 Technology introduced two larger Heliodisplays, the M50 and M100. The M50 has a 50" diagonal image, equivalent to displaying a life-size head-and-shoulders person. The M100 has a 100" diagonal image, equivalent to displaying a large full-body person (about 2 meters tall).

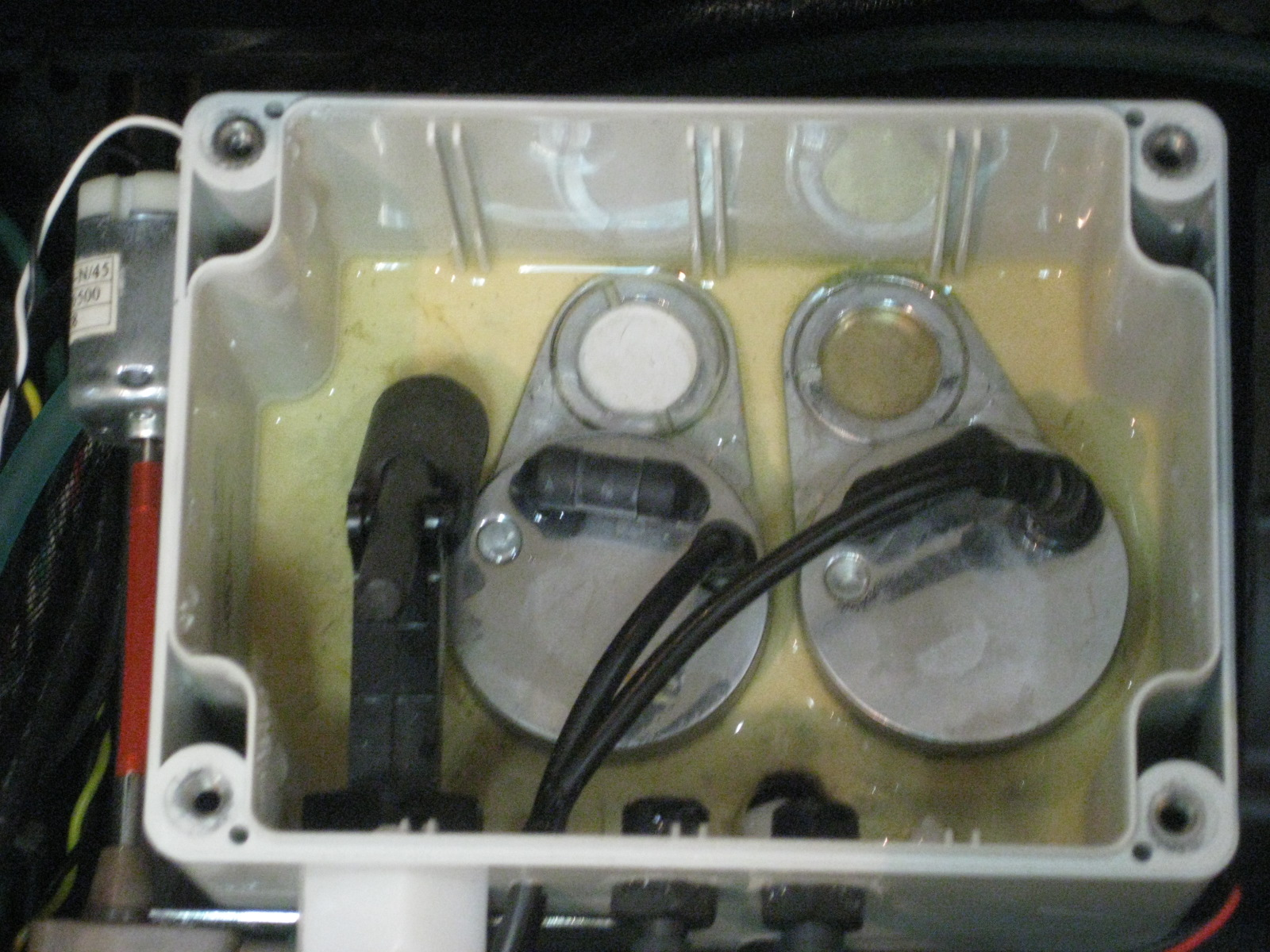
Piezoelectric ultrasonic transducer used to vaporize water for a Heliodisplay.

=== S, L, and XL ===
In 2011, IO2 reintroduced the smaller format Heliodisplays along with the standard L (large) models that project approximately a 2-meter-tall image (for life-size person projections). The L models can be placed on the floor as a standing tower and take up slightly more area than a sheet of paper (14 inches in diameter) and weigh in around 70 lbs (31.8 kg), allowing it to be moved around by one person. Power consumption for the base tower 2-meter version is as energy efficient as the legacy models and consumes around 300 watts. The system is based on improvements to the M100, and similarly, the small) models over the legacy versions of the m30, both in image and user interface. The XL model is a separate system that supports larger-format images beyond the 2-meter range. All units from 2009 have a simple interface with a single on/off button and power cord.

=== i versions ===
IO2 incorporated various advances to the existing platforms, and most of the equipment's weight was reduced by close to 50%. Current 2.3-meter systems weigh closer to 38 lbs (17.2 kg), along with a 20% reduction in form factor and footprint. Equipment efficiency was improved to over 90%, while still maintaining its relatively quiet operation of around 39 dB (as compared to other fan-based technologies). Image recovery time is under 1 second in some models, along with wireless communication to limit the cables to only the power cord. Overall image fidelity and stability were further improved.
