= George Tyndall =

American gynecologist (died 2023)

George Tyndall's profile photo from USC

George Tyndall (1946 or 1947 – October 4, 2023) was an American gynecologist. In 2019 he was under investigation in the Los Angeles Police Department's largest investigation of sexual abuse by a single perpetrator.

== Early life and education ==
Tyndall was born and raised in Plattsburgh, New York, as one of five children. He had French ancestry on his mother's side. He attended the State University of New York Plattsburgh but discontinued his studies to join the Navy in 1967. While in the Navy, he was sent to the Defense Language Institute in Monterey to study Vietnamese, a language that was in high demand for the American Intelligence efforts during the Vietnam War. He was eventually stationed in Manila in the Philippines. Tyndall learned Tagalog during this time.

In 1971, Tyndall was honorably discharged from the Navy and resumed studies at the State University of New York, where he graduated summa cum laude.

=== Training in obstetrics and gynecology ===
In 1980, Tyndall returned to the Philippines to begin medical school at the University of the East, Ramon Magsaysay Memorial Medical Center. He later transferred to the Drexel University College of Medicine (previously the Medical College of Pennsylvania).

== Career ==
Upon graduation from medical school, Tyndall was selected for a residency in obstetrics and gynecology at Kaiser in Los Angeles. During his residency he focused on preventative care, and upon completion of residency he found an opening in the student health center at the University of Southern California.

Tyndall practiced at the University of Southern California University Park Health Center and later the USC Engemann Student Health Center. He worked at the university from August 14, 1989, to June 21, 2016. For the majority of this time, he was the only full-time gynecologist.

== Allegations of sexual abuse and harassment ==
On May 16, 2018 the Los Angeles Times published an article investigating allegations of sexual abuse. Since the publication, hundreds of women have come forward accusing Tyndall of sexual abuse and racial discrimination.

On June 26, 2019 Tyndall was arrested by the Los Angeles Police Department and charged with 29 felonies related to allegations by 16 women for incidents taking place from 2009 to 2016. The 29 felonies consist of 18 counts of sexual penetration and 11 counts of sexual battery by fraud. The victims were age 17 to 29, had evidence to support claims, and fell within the statute of limitations. George Tyndall pleaded not guilty to the charges. Bail was set to $2.1 million and later lowered to $1.6 million. On July 9, 2020, prosecutors added six additional charges of sexual assault and battery: five counts of sexual penetration and one additional count of sexual battery by fraud.

On May 23, 2019 the University of Southern California released unsealed documents related to Tyndall's employment under federal court order. The records include student complaints, internal correspondence between Tyndall and USC employees, and Tyndall's performance evaluations. Much of the correspondence is with Larry Neinstein, then-executive director of the USC E.S.H.C., who died in 2016.

Following the release of the initial Los Angeles Times article published on May 16, 2018, hundreds of USC students and alumni have come forward with allegations of sexual abuse, assault, battery, and harassment. Over the years, many patients reported that Tyndall was unprofessional, creepy, or made them feel "uncomfortable and violated." There were multiple requests to change providers and not see Tyndall again. Complaints were generally addressed internally by USC Engemann Student Health Center executive director, Larry Neinstein.

- In 1991, an undergraduate student reported Tyndall for taking improper photographs, including close-up photos of her genitals and full-body pictures.
- In 2000, a student complained when Tyndall told her a story of the rock guitarist from Megadeth having sex in public on the streets of Chicago. A letter from the student says that it was "degrading and humiliating."
- In both September 2003 and February 2004, it was reported that George Tyndall did not permit chaperones (medical assistants and nurses) access behind the curtain during gynecological examinations; Neinstein had a conversation with Tyndall regarding the concern. In response to the 2004 complaint, Neinstein documented that the men had a conversation and Tyndall "understood." Tyndall continued to block chaperones' access until eventually the physical layout of the examination rooms was altered.
- A 2005 complaint came from a student who was "made extremely uncomfortable by... comments about my sexual past and my sexual orientation. The comments were completely irrelevant to my appointment and made me feel uncomfortable."
- In October 2009, a student reported that Tyndall made an inappropriate comment about her pubic hair saying "This is nice. Laser hair removal?" The student said she felt uncomfortable, embarrassed, and angry. Larry Neinstein's notes say that he addressed the issue with Tyndall by recommending that "if [Tyndall] was going to talk about pubic hair...to do this when the student was dressed...if he found someone who might have a good procedure that could be recommended to other students he would phrase it this way." Neinstein noted that "[Tyndall] understood."
- In October 2016, a complaint said that the "Practitioner repeatedly insinuated that I was promiscuous...and made me feel like a horrible person."
- In May 2016, internal notes of USC staff concerns regarding George Tyndall state "he continues to say inappropriate things to student, patients and staff...talks about nipples being perky, vaginal muscle tone" and ask if the patient is a runner.

== Allegations of racial harassment and discrimination ==
Over the years, USC Engemann Student Health Center received multiple reports of inappropriate racial comments from both students and staff. The concerns were eventually forwarded to the USC Office of Equity and Diversity in 2003. Reports include:

- Statements such as "Mexicans are taking over" and there would be a "reconquista."
- Statements such as "Hispanics have green thumbs so I like to ask them to care for my plant when I am off."
- Denial of an African-American student (with authorized access) to the Student Health Center after hours.
- A statement that "black women have too many children."
- A question to an African American colleague "Why do you speak so well?" and said something to the effect of "most blacks don't know proper English."
- A January 2016 student complaint states "Dr. Tyndall is a racist. He treated me like a criminal and less than a person."
- Internal staff comments of Tyndall state that it "seems when [he] gets minorities (African) Dr. Tyndall [makes them] wait longer than Asian or White patients."
- Reports that Tyndall made comments that students "looked like [his] wife" and told students about his "beautiful Filipina wife."

=== Treatment of international students ===
External investigation by MDReview demonstrates that Tyndall had a preference for East Asian patients and international students.

Tyndall spoke during interviews of his particular interest in international students, especially those from China, saying he tried to empathize with the patients. There are accusations that Tyndall preferred international students because they were easier to victimize due to being unfamiliar with the culture, English language, and practice of American gynecology.

== Internal investigations by the University of Southern California ==
Concerns with George Tyndall's conduct and behavior were primarily handled internally at the USC health centers by Larry Neinstein (then executive director), William Leavitt (Tyndall's supervisor), and the E.S.H.C. director of Quality and Safety. In June 2013, Neinstein contacted the USC Office of Equity and Diversity (O.E.D.) regarding student and staff complaints. O.E.D. representatives investigated through interviews with USC E.S.H.C. staff and one student who had voiced a complaint. Interviews of staff yielded similar comments of Tyndall making patients feel uncomfortable and multiple students refusing to see Tyndall again. The O.E.D. reported that there was insufficient evidence of USC policy violation and no justification for continuing investigation. On June 2, 2016, George Tyndall again was reported to the USC Office of Equity and Diversity. E.S.H.C. staff were interviewed and made the following reports.

- While performing examinations, Tyndall would comment on patients' vaginal tone and make comments such as "are you a runner?" nearly every day on nearly every patient.
- Tyndall would perform full body checks, citing that he was checking for skin cancer; this is not standard practice for gynecology and was not documented in patient medical records.

Internal documents state that "Unfortunately the [Medical Assistants] have worked with this so long and feel our management has known about it, yet nothing has been done...At this point they do not keep track of specific names as it occurs every day." In October 2016, an E.S.H.C. staff member contacted the O.E.D. and said that "past experience has proven that going to HR about issues within E.S.H.C. result in [the staff making the report] being seen as the problem."

In June 2016, E.S.H.C. staff reported Tyndall to USC's Relationship and Sexual Violence Prevention Services. They reported frustration that prior reports to the university had not led to meaningful consequence or change in Tyndall's behavior. In conjunction with the recent discovery of patient photographs stored in Tyndall's office, he was placed on paid administrative leave effective June 17, 2016.

== Additional concerns and violations ==
There were many reports of concerns about George Tyndall's hygiene and cleanliness. In June 2016 a nurse reported that she had never seen Tyndall wash his hands before or after a patient visit. Staff reported at least two occasions during which Tyndall asked to keep a patient's intrauterine device (I.U.D.) after it had been removed.

In October 2007 and April 2016 multiple USC staff complained about the cleanliness of Tyndall's office including that it was a mess, filled with garbage and clutter, and "smell[ed] horrible."

The unsanitary conditions of his office were what ultimately led to Tyndall's placement on administrative leave. While he was on vacation during June 2016, E.S.H.C. facilities staff noticed an infestation of flies and bugs and the source was determined to be Tyndall's office. While cleaning his office, a locked file cabinet filled with pictures of patients, some including names and identification numbers, was discovered. The following day he was placed on administrative leave for violation of Engemann policies of office maintenance and protection of patient health information.

== External investigation November 2016: MDReview ==
On November 15 and 16, external MDReview consultants visited USC to conduct an investigation relative to George Tyndall's behaviors. More than seventeen USC staff were interviewed (including George Tyndall). MDReview concluded that "significant concern exists that many of Dr. Tyndall's practices are not within the current standard of care... he repeatedly exhibits behavior that is unprofessional, inappropriate, and/or unusual." Interviewers found that his practices in connection with breast and pelvic examinations, moreover, did not sufficiently ensure patients' informed decisionmaking. The report stated that some of Tyndall's behaviors were "potentially indicative of underlying psychopathy" and raised significant concerns about the physical and psychological safety of patients. According to the MDReview report, the following are "verbatim quotes" taken from E.S.H.C. personnel:

- Described as a hoarder. Office is very unclean.
- Never washes hands.
- Uses a rag in his pocket to open doors.
- Prefers Asian and/or international patients.
- One finger and then two fingers.
- "At your age you won't have breast cancer."
- "Ask your boyfriend."
- "Your husband will be happy."

== Aftermath and University of Southern California response ==
On January 31, 2017 the Office of Equity and Diversity presented Tyndall and E.S.H.C. administration with the findings of investigations regarding the multiple allegations. His actions were not deemed a violation of USC's sexual harassment policy and were referred back to USC Engemann Student Health Center. It was determined that Tyndall violated the USC policies against race harassment and the issue was forwarded to human resources.

In May 2017 after the conclusion of the investigation, Tyndall was told that he faced termination. As an alternative to termination, Tyndall was offered a severance package if he agreed to resign. He resigned effective June 30, 2017 with a severance package of an undisclosed amount.

According to the Los Angeles Times, USC stated that they were under no legal obligation to report Tyndall to the Medical Board because it is not governed by the rules of hospitals and clinics. Ultimately, the university reported Tyndall after he asked to be reinstated in March 2018.

On May 25, 2018 USC President C. L. Max Nikias resigned due to pressure from the USC community. Professors and students were unhappy with the university's handling of the Tyndall situation, particularly after the July 2017 scandal of USC Keck School of Medicine Dean Carmen Puliafito.

== Criminal investigation, class action settlement, and civil lawsuits ==
=== Criminal investigation by Los Angeles Police Department ===
The accusations of George Tyndall became the largest investigation of sexual abuse performed by L.A.P.D. against a single perpetrator. After the discovery of illicit photos in Tyndall's office, L.A.P.D. obtained half a dozen search warrants for his personal property including Tyndall's home and storage units. Findings included hundreds more images of unclothed women, some taken in clinic settings. Dozens of hard drives were also discovered. After the searches of Tyndall's belongings it was discovered that he was selling "homemade sex tapes" and photos made in hotel rooms in the Philippines.

Preliminary hearings on 35 total felony charges by the Los Angeles District Attorney's Office began in November 2021 and continued into 2022, with testimonies by former patients of Tyndall. If convicted on all charges, Tyndall faced up to 64 years in prison.

=== Class action settlement: $215 million ===
In June 2019, USC agreed to a $215 million class-action settlement for tens of thousands of women treated by Tyndall from August 14, 1989 to June 21, 2016. Amounts vary from $2,500 to $250,000 and will be compensated based on the severity of misconduct and the patient's willingness to provide written statements or interviews with mental health professionals.

=== 2021 settlement ===
On March 25, 2021, USC and a group of 710 women suing the school announced that they had reached an $852 million settlement, the largest sexual abuse settlement against any university. This brought the total value of the settlements to nearly $1.1 billion.

== Personal life and death ==
George Tyndall married Daisy Patricio, a Filipina woman from Mindanao. Tyndall was approximately 20 years her senior. Tyndall and his wife lived in the Lafayette Park neighborhood of Los Angeles and did not have any children. Tyndall was found dead in his bed on October 4, 2023, while awaiting trial on numerous charges. He was 76. His death was caused by cardiovascular disease.
