= Bionic contact lens =

Proposed device to display information

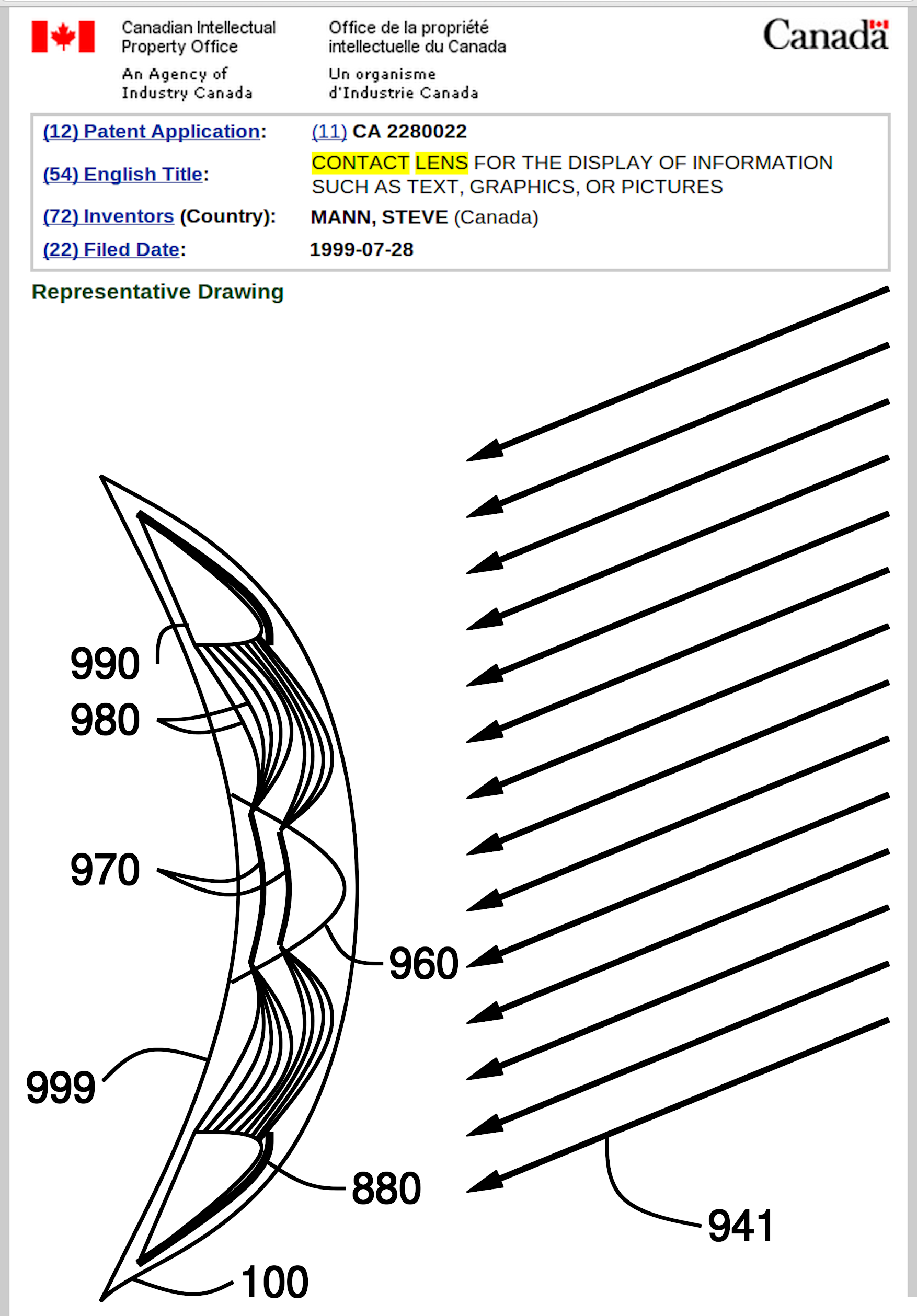
Early embodiment of contact lens display, Canadian patent application 2280022, 1999 July 28th

A bionic contact lens is a proposed device that could provide a virtual display that could have a variety of uses from assisting the visually impaired to video gaming, as claimed by the manufacturers and developers. The device will have the form of a conventional contact lens with added bionics technology in the form of a head-up display, with functional electronic circuits and infrared lights to create a virtual display allowing the viewer to see a computer-generated display superimposed on the world outside.

== Proposed components ==
An antenna on the lens could pick up a radio frequency.

In 2016, work on Interscatter from the University of Washington has shown the first Wi-Fi enabled contact lens prototype that can communicate directly with mobile devices such as smartphones at data rates between 2–11 Mbit/s.

== Development ==
Development of the first contact lens display began in the 1990s.

Experimental versions of these devices have been demonstrated, such as one developed by Sandia National Laboratories. The lens is expected to have more electronics and capabilities on the areas where the eye does not see. Radio frequency power transmission and solar cells are expected in future developments. Recent work augmented the contact lens with Wi-Fi connectivity.

In 2011, a functioning prototype with a wireless antenna and a single-pixel display was developed.

Previous prototypes proved that it is possible to create a biologically safe electronic lens that does not obstruct a person's view. Engineers have tested the finished lenses on rabbits for up to 20 minutes and the animals showed no problems.

== See also ==
- Augmented reality
- Google Contact Lens
- Heads-up display
- Optical head-mounted display
- Smartglasses
- Visual prosthesis
