= Carmen Puliafito =

American ophthalmologist and academic

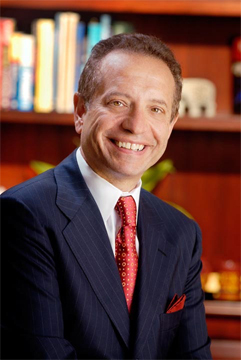
- Born: Carmen Anthony Puliafito; January 5, 1951 (age 74–75); Buffalo, New York, U.S.
- Children: 3

Academic background
- Education: Harvard University (AB, MD); University of Pennsylvania (MBA)

Academic work
- Discipline: Ophthalmology
- Sub-discipline: Optical coherence tomography
- Institutions: University of Miami; University of Southern California

Dean of the Keck School of Medicine of USC
- In office 2007 – March 2016
- Preceded by: Brian E. Henderson
- Succeeded by: Rohit Varma (interim)

Carmen Anthony Puliafito (born January 5, 1951) is an American ophthalmologist and former academic administrator. From 2007 until March 2016, he was dean of the Keck School of Medicine of USC.

In 2017, the Los Angeles Times revealed that Puliafito had engaged in parties with young recreational drug users and prostitutes, including at the Keck School's offices, and that Puliafito had smoked methamphetamine at these events.

== Early life and education ==
Born and raised in Buffalo, New York, Puliafito received a Bachelor of Arts degree from Harvard College in 1973 and a Doctor of Medicine from Harvard Medical School in 1978. He completed a residency in ophthalmology and a fellowship in vitreoretinal surgery at the Massachusetts Eye and Ear Infirmary. Puliafito also earned an MBA from the Wharton School of the University of Pennsylvania.

== Career ==
Puliafito was appointed dean of the Keck School of Medicine of USC in December 2007. Before that, he had been director of the Bascom Palmer Eye Institute of the Miller School of Medicine at the University of Miami, and chair of the department of ophthalmology. The institute has regularly been ranked as the best eye hospital and vision research center in the nation by U.S. News & World Report. In 2012, he was 21st of the highest-paid research university executives in the United States. While dean, he served on the board of the Children's Hospital Los Angeles.

In March 2016, Puliafito resigned as dean of the Keck School of Medicine, and USC professor Rohit Varma was appointed interim dean. After leaving USC, he took a role as chief of strategic development with a pharmaceutical company called Ophthotech that was developing new drugs for eye diseases; he was laid off along with 80% of the staff in December 2016 when two phase III clinical trials produced negative results.

Puliafito's California medical license was revoked based on disciplinary orders on August 17, 2018.

=== Research ===
Puliafito was one of the inventors of optical coherence tomography; for this work, James Fujimoto, Eric Swanson and Puliafito received a Rank Prize for Opto-Electronics in 2002. In 2012, Fujimoto, Swanson, and David Huang, with Puliafito and Joel Schuman, received an António Champalimaud Vision Award from the Champalimaud Foundation.

Puliafito participated in research into the use of bevacizumab for the treatment of retinal disorders.

=== 2017 Los Angeles Times report ===
The Los Angeles Times reported in July 2017 that while Puliafito served as dean and USC professor, he "kept company with a circle of criminals and drug users who said he used methamphetamine and other drugs with them." The reporters reviewed video and photographs of Puliafito engaging in these activities in hotel rooms, apartments, and the dean's office. According to the newspaper, a 21-year-old prostitute had overdosed while taking drugs with Puliafito in a Pasadena hotel room on March 4, 2016; the article included a recording of a conversation between a 911 operator and Puliafito. The report said that police had found methamphetamine in the room. Three weeks later, on March 24, 2016, Puliafito resigned as dean of the Keck School of Medicine. Nothing was said about the incident; he said he was resigning because he wished to "return to academic ophthalmology and pursue some identified opportunities in healthcare."

Immediately following the publication of the 2017 Los Angeles Times report, USC announced that Puliafito had been placed "on leave from his roles at USC, including seeing patients."

In July 2022, Paul Pringle, the reporter who first uncovered and reported the story of Puliafito's activities, published a book entitled Bad City: Peril and Power in the City of Angels. It describes his year-long struggle to get the story published over the objections of his superiors at the Times, who did not want to offend USC. Pringle's investigation of the case began with the March 2016 incident, but the paper refused to publish it. He and colleagues persisted, continuing to research the case until the report was finally published in July 2017, long after Puliafito had resigned as dean.

== Personal life ==
Puliafito and his wife, Janet Pine, had three children. A psychiatrist, Pine met Puliafito while they were students at Harvard Medical School. He was fired by USC for engaging in a pattern of illegal drug use and sometimes partied with a group of drug users in his USC offices.

As of 2019, in a Final Decision & Order on behalf of the Massachusetts Board of Registration in Medicine, the Board revoked Dr. Carmen A. Puliafito’s right to renew his medical license after it found that he had been disciplined in California for conduct that undermines the public confidence in the medical profession.
