= Visual prosthesis =

Device intended to restore vision to blind people

A visual prosthesis, often referred to as a bionic eye, is a visual device intended to restore functional vision in those with partial or total blindness. Many devices have been developed, usually modeled on the cochlear implant or bionic ear devices, a type of neural prosthesis in use since the mid-1980s. The idea of using electrical current (e.g., electrically stimulating the retina or the visual cortex) to provide sight dates back to the 18th century, discussed by Benjamin Franklin, Tiberius Cavallo, and Charles LeRoy.

== Biological considerations ==
The ability to give sight to a blind person via a bionic eye depends on the circumstances surrounding the loss of sight. For retinal prostheses, which are the most prevalent visual prosthetic under development (due to ease of access to the retina among other considerations), patients with vision loss due to degeneration of photoreceptors (retinitis pigmentosa, choroideremia, geographic atrophy macular degeneration) are the best candidates for treatment. Candidates for visual prosthetic implants find the procedure most successful if the optic nerve was developed prior to the onset of blindness. Persons born with blindness may lack a fully developed optical nerve, which typically develops prior to birth, though neuroplasticity makes it possible for the nerve, and sight, to develop after implantation.

== Technological considerations ==
Visual prosthetics are being developed as a potentially valuable aid for individuals with visual degradation. Only three visual prosthetic devices have received marketing approval in the EU. Argus II, co-developed at the University of Southern California (USC) Eye Institute and manufactured by Second Sight Medical Products Inc., was the first device to have received marketing approval (CE Mark in Europe in 2011). Most other efforts remain investigational; the Retina Implant AG's Alpha IMS won a CE Mark July 2013 and is a significant improvement in resolution. It is not, however, FDA-approved in the US.

== Ongoing projects ==
=== Argus retinal prosthesis ===
Mark Humayun, who joined the faculty of the Keck School of Medicine of USC Department of Ophthalmology in 2001; Eugene Dejuan, now at the University of California San Francisco; engineer Howard D. Phillips; bio-electronics engineer Wentai Liu, now at University of California Los Angeles; and Robert Greenberg, now of Second Sight, were the original inventors of the active epi-retinal prosthesis and demonstrated proof of principle in acute patient investigations at Johns Hopkins University in the early 1990s. In the late 1990s the company Second Sight was formed by Greenberg along with medical device entrepreneur, Alfred E. Mann, Their first-generation implant had 16 electrodes and was implanted in six subjects by Humayun at University of Southern California between 2002 and 2004. In 2007, the company began a trial of its second-generation, 60-electrode implant, dubbed the Argus II, in the US and in Europe. In total 30 subjects participated in the studies spanning 10 sites in four countries. In the spring of 2011, based on the results of the clinical study which were published in 2012, Argus II was approved for commercial use in Europe, and Second Sight launched the product later that same year. The Argus II was approved by the United States FDA on 14 February 2013. Three US government funding agencies (National Eye Institute, Department of Energy, and National Science Foundation) have supported the work at Second Sight, USC, UCSC, Caltech, and other research labs.

=== Microsystem-based visual prosthesis (MIVP) ===
Designed by Claude Veraart at the University of Louvain in 2002, this is a spiral cuff electrode around the optic nerve at the back of the eye. It is connected to a stimulator implanted in a small depression in the skull. The stimulator receives signals from an externally worn camera, which are translated into electrical signals that stimulate the optic nerve directly.

=== Implantable miniature telescope ===
Although not truly an active prosthesis, an implantable miniature telescope is one type of visual implant that has met with some success in the treatment of end-stage age-related macular degeneration. This type of device is implanted in the eye's posterior chamber and works by increasing (by about three times) the size of the image projected onto the retina in order to overcome a centrally located scotoma or blind spot.

Created by VisionCare Ophthalmic Technologies in conjunction with the CentraSight Treatment Program in 2011, the telescope is about the size of a pea and is implanted behind the iris of one eye. Images are projected onto healthy areas of the central retina, outside the degenerated macula, and is enlarged to reduce the effect the blind spot has on central vision. 2.2x or 2.7x magnification strengths make it possible to see or discern the central vision object of interest while the other eye is used for peripheral vision because the eye that has the implant will have limited peripheral vision as a side effect. Unlike a telescope which would be hand-held, the implant moves with the eye which is the main advantage. Patients using the device may however still need glasses for optimal vision and for close work. Before surgery, patients should first try out a hand-held telescope to see if they would benefit from image enlargement. One of the main drawbacks is that it cannot be used for patients who have had cataract surgery as the intraocular lens would obstruct insertion of the telescope. It also requires a large incision in the cornea to insert.

A Cochrane systematic review seeking to evaluate the effectiveness and safety of the implantable miniature telescope for patients with late or advanced age-related macular degeneration found only one ongoing study evaluating the OriLens intraocular telescope, with results expected in 2020.

=== Tübingen MPDA Project Alpha IMS ===
A Southern German team led by the University Eye Hospital in Tübingen, was formed in 1995 by Eberhart Zrenner to develop a subretinal prosthesis. The chip is located behind the retina and utilizes microphotodiode arrays (MPDA) which collect incident light and transform it into electrical current stimulating the retinal ganglion cells. As natural photoreceptors are far more efficient than photodiodes, visible light is not powerful enough to stimulate the MPDA. Therefore, an external power supply is used to enhance the stimulation current. The German team commenced in vivo experiments in 2000, when evoked cortical potentials were measured from Yucatán micropigs and rabbits. At 14 months post implantation, the implant and retina surrounding it were examined and there were no noticeable changes to anatomical integrity. The implants were successful in producing evoked cortical potentials in half of the animals tested. The thresholds identified in this study were similar to those required in epiretinal stimulation. Later reports from this group concern the results of a clinical pilot study on 11 participants with retinitis pigmentosa. Some blind patients were able to read letters, recognize unknown objects, localize a plate, a cup and cutlery. Two of the patients were found to make microsaccades similar to those of healthy control participants, and the properties of the eye movements depended on the stimuli that the patients were viewing—suggesting that eye movements might be useful measures for evaluating vision restored by implants. Multicenter study started in 2010, using a fully implantable device with 1500 Electrodes Alpha IMS (produced by Retina Implant AG, Reutlingen, Germany), with 10 patients included; preliminary results were presented at ARVO 2011. The first UK implantations took place in March 2012 and were led by Robert MacLaren at the University of Oxford and Tim Jackson at King's College Hospital in London. David Wong also implanted the Tübingen device in a patient in Hong Kong.

On 19 March 2019 Retina Implant AG discontinued business activities quoting innovation-hostile climate of Europe's rigid regulatory systems and unsatisfactory results in patients.

=== Harvard/MIT Retinal Implant ===
Joseph Rizzo and John Wyatt at the Massachusetts Eye and Ear Infirmary and MIT began researching the feasibility of a retinal prosthesis in 1989, and performed a number of proof-of-concept epiretinal stimulation trials on blind volunteers between 1998 and 2000. They have since developed a subretinal stimulator, an array of electrodes, that is placed beneath the retina in the subretinal space and receives image signals beamed from a camera mounted on a pair of glasses. The stimulator chip decodes the picture information beamed from the camera and stimulates retinal ganglion cells accordingly. Their second generation prosthesis collects data and sends it to the implant through radio frequency fields from transmitter coils that are mounted on the glasses. A secondary receiver coil is sutured around the iris.

=== Artificial silicon retina (ASR) ===
The brothers Alan and Vincent Chow developed a microchip in 2002 containing 3500 photodiodes, which detect light and convert it into electrical impulses, which stimulate healthy retinal ganglion cells. The ASR requires no externally worn devices.

The original Optobionics Corp. stopped operations, but Chow acquired the Optobionics name, the ASR implants and plans to reorganize a new company under the same name. The ASR microchip is a 2mm in diameter silicon chip (same concept as computer chips) containing ~5,000 microscopic solar cells called "microphotodiodes" that each have their own stimulating electrode.

=== Photovoltaic retinal prosthesis (PRIMA) ===
Daniel Palanker and his group at Stanford University developed a photovoltaic retinal prosthesis in 2012, that includes a subretinal photodiode array and an infrared image projection system mounted on video goggles. Images captured by video camera are processed in a pocket PC and displayed on video goggles using pulsed near-infrared (IR, 880–915 nm) light. These images are projected onto the retina via natural eye optics, and photodiodes in the subretinal implant convert light into pulsed bi-phasic electric current in each pixel. Electric current flowing through the tissue between the active and return electrode in each pixel stimulates the nearby inner retinal neurons, primarily the bipolar cells, which transmit excitatory responses to the retinal ganglion cells. This technology is being commercialized by Pixium Vision (PRIMA), and is being evaluated in a clinical trial (2018). Following this proof of concept, Palanker group is focusing now on developing pixels smaller than 50μm using 3-D electrodes and utilizing the effect of retinal migration into voids in the subretinal implant.

=== Bionic Vision Technologies (BVT) ===
Bionic Vision Technologies (BVT) is a company, that has taken over the research and commercialisation rights of Bionic Vision Australia (BVA). BVA was a consortium of some of Australia's leading universities and research institutes, and funded by the Australian Research Council from 2010, it ceased operations on 31 December 2016. The members of the consortium consisted of Bionics Institute, UNSW Sydney, Data 61 CSRIO, Center for Eye Research Australia (CERA), and The University of Melbourne. There were many more partners as well. The Australian Federal Government awarded a $42 million ARC grant to Bionic Vision Australia to develop bionic vision technology.

While the BVA consortium was still together, the team was led by Professor Anthony Burkitt, and they were developing two retinal prostheses. One known as The Wide-View device, that combined novel technologies with materials that had been successfully used in other clinical implants. This approach incorporated a microchip with 98 stimulating electrodes and aimed to provide increased mobility for patients to help them move safely in their environment. This implant would be placed in the suprachoroidal space. Researchers expected the first patient tests to begin with this device in 2013, it is currently unknown whether full trials were conducted, but at least one woman named Dianne Ashworth was implanted with the device, and was able to read letters and numbers using it., she later went on to write a book titled "I Spy with My Bionic Eye", about her life, vision loss, and being the first person to be implanted with the BVA, Bionic Eye device.

BVA was also concurrently developing the High-Acuity device, which incorporated a number of new technologies to bring together a microchip and an implant with 1024 electrodes. The device aimed to provide functional central vision to assist with tasks such as face recognition and reading large print. This high-acuity implant would be inserted epiretinally. Patient tests were planned for this device in 2014 once preclinical testing had been completed, it is unknown whether these trials ever took place.

Patients with retinitis pigmentosa were to be the first to participate in the studies, followed by age-related macular degeneration. Each prototype consisted of a camera, attached to a pair of glasses which sent the signal to the implanted microchip, where it was converted into electrical impulses to stimulate the remaining healthy neurons in the retina. This information was then passed on to the optic nerve and the vision processing centres of the brain.

On 2 January 2019, BVT released positive results from a set of trials on four Australians using a new version of the device. Older versions of the device were only designed to be used temporarily, but the new design allowed the technology to be used constantly, and for the first time outside the lab, even to be taken home. More implants are to be administered throughout 2019.

According to fact sheets dated March, 2019, on BVT's website, they expect the device to obtain market approval in 3 to 5 years.

=== Dobelle Eye ===
Similar in function to the Harvard/MIT device, except the stimulator chip sits in the primary visual cortex, rather than on the retina. Many subjects have been implanted with a high success rate and limited negative effects. The project first began in 2002 and was still in the developmental phase, upon the death of Dobelle, selling the eye for profit was ruled against in favor of donating it to a publicly funded research team.

=== Intracortical visual prosthesis ===
The Laboratory of Neural Prosthetics at Illinois Institute of Technology (IIT), Chicago, started developing a visual prosthetic using intracortical electrode arrays in 2009. While similar in principle to the Dobelle system, the use of intracortical electrodes allow for greatly increased spatial resolution in the stimulation signals (more electrodes per unit area). In addition, a wireless telemetry system is being developed to eliminate the need for transcranial wires. Arrays of activated iridium oxide film (AIROF)-coated electrodes will be implanted in the visual cortex, located on the occipital lobe of the brain. External hardware will capture images, process them, and generate instructions which will then be transmitted to implanted circuitry via a telemetry link. The circuitry will decode the instructions and stimulate the electrodes, in turn stimulating the visual cortex. The group is developing a wearable external image capture and processing system to accompany the implanted circuitry. Studies on animals and psychophysical studies on humans are being conducted to test the feasibility of a human volunteer implant.

Stephen Macknik and Susana Martinez-Conde at SUNY Downstate Medical Center are also developing an intracortical visual prosthetic, called OBServe. The planned system will use an LED array, a video camera, optogenetics, adeno-associated virus transfection, and eye tracking. Components are currently being developed and tested in animals.

== See also ==
- Brainport
- Bionic contact lens
- Human echolocation
