= List of French sportspeople =

This is a partial list of French sportspeople. For the full plain list of French sportspeople on Wikipedia, see Category:French sportspeople.

== Alpine skiing ==
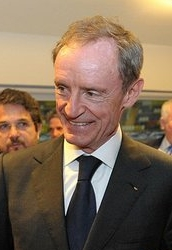
Jean-Claude Killy

- Émile Allais
- Sébastien Amiez
- François Bonlieu
- Didier Bouvet
- Charles Bozon
- Joël Chenal
- James Couttet
- Jean-Luc Crétier
- Danièle Debernard
- Antoine Dénériaz
- Annie Famose
- Christine Goitschel
- Marielle Goitschel
- Jean-Claude Killy
- Léo Lacroix
- Florence Masnada
- Carole Merle
- Isabelle Mir
- Steve Missillier
- Carole Montillet
- Henri Oreiller
- Perrine Pelen
- Guy Périllat
- Laure Pequegnot
- Franck Piccard
- Alexis Pinturault
- Florence Steurer
- Jean-Pierre Vidal
- Jean Vuarnet

== Association football ==
- Christophe Ajas (born 1972)
- Bruno Audebrand (born 1968)
- Guillaume Benon (born 1975), defender
- Denis Bourdoncle (born 1964), defender
- Cyril Cassese (born 1972), forward
- David Castilla (born 1977), goalkeeper
- Fabrice Catherine (born 1973), goalkeeper
- David Chevallereau (born 1969), goalkeeper
- Sylvain Chomlafel (born 1966), forward
- Emmanuel Clément (born 1971), midfielder
- Bertrand Gallou (born 1974), goalkeeper
- Olivier Giroud (born 1986)
- Thierry Henry (born 1977), forward
- Kylian Mbappé (born 1998), forward
- Zinedine Zidane (born 1972), forward

== Badminton ==
- Maxime Mora

== Basketball ==
- Jaylen Hoard
- Victor Wembanyama

== Biathlon ==
- Victor Arbez
- René Arpin
- Célia Aymonier
- Patrice Bailly-Salins
- Jean-Guillaume Béatrix
- Xavier Blond (biathlete)
- Yves Blondeau
- Alexis Bœuf
- Yannick Bourseaux
- Stéphane Bouthiaux
- Sandrine Bailly
- Florence Baverel-Robert
- Sylvie Becaert
- Camille Bened
- Anaïs Bescond
- Sophie Boilley
- Marine Bolliet
- Paula Botet
- Célia Bourgeois
- Justine Braisaz-Bouchet
- Anne Briand
- Marie-Laure Brunet
- Ferréol Cannard
- Anthony Chalençon
- Paul Chassagne
- Thomas Clarion
- Émilien Claude
- Fabien Claude
- Florent Claude
- Daniel Claudon
- Éric Claudon
- Benjamin Daviet
- Vincent Defrasne
- Simon Desthieux
- Christian Dumont
- Guy Duraffourg
- Thierry Dusserre
- Marius Falquy
- Quentin Fillon Maillet
- Hervé Flandin
- Martin Fourcade
- Simon Fourcade
- André Geourjon
- Thierry Gerbier
- Jean-Paul Giachino
- Aimé Gruet-Masson
- Antonin Guigonnat
- Andreas Heymann
- Émilien Jacquelin
- Vincent Jay
- Emmanuel Lacroix
- Lionel Laurent
- Serge Legrand
- Oscar Lombardot
- Gilles Marguet
- Gilbert Mercier
- René Mercier
- Francis Mougel
- Yvon Mougel
- Éric Perrot
- Franck Perrot
- Raphaël Poirée
- Christian Poirot
- Julien Robert
- Louis Romand
- Paul Romand
- Denis Sandona
- Karl Tabouret
- Noël Turrell
- Jean-Claude Viry
- Sophie Chauveau
- Anaïs Chevalier-Bouchet
- Chloé Chevalier
- Emmanuelle Claret
- Véronique Claudel
- Maya Cloetens
- Caroline Colombo
- Marie Dorin Habert
- Anne Floriet
- Christelle Gros
- Gilonne Guigonnat
- Delphyne Heymann
- Lou Jeanmonnot
- Enora Latuillière
- Pauline Macabies
- Océane Michelon
- Corinne Niogret
- Delphyne Peretto
- Jeanne Richard
- Julia Simon
- Coline Varcin

== Canoe ==
- Jessica Fox (born 1994), French-Australian Olympic and world champion slalom canoer

== Biathlon ==
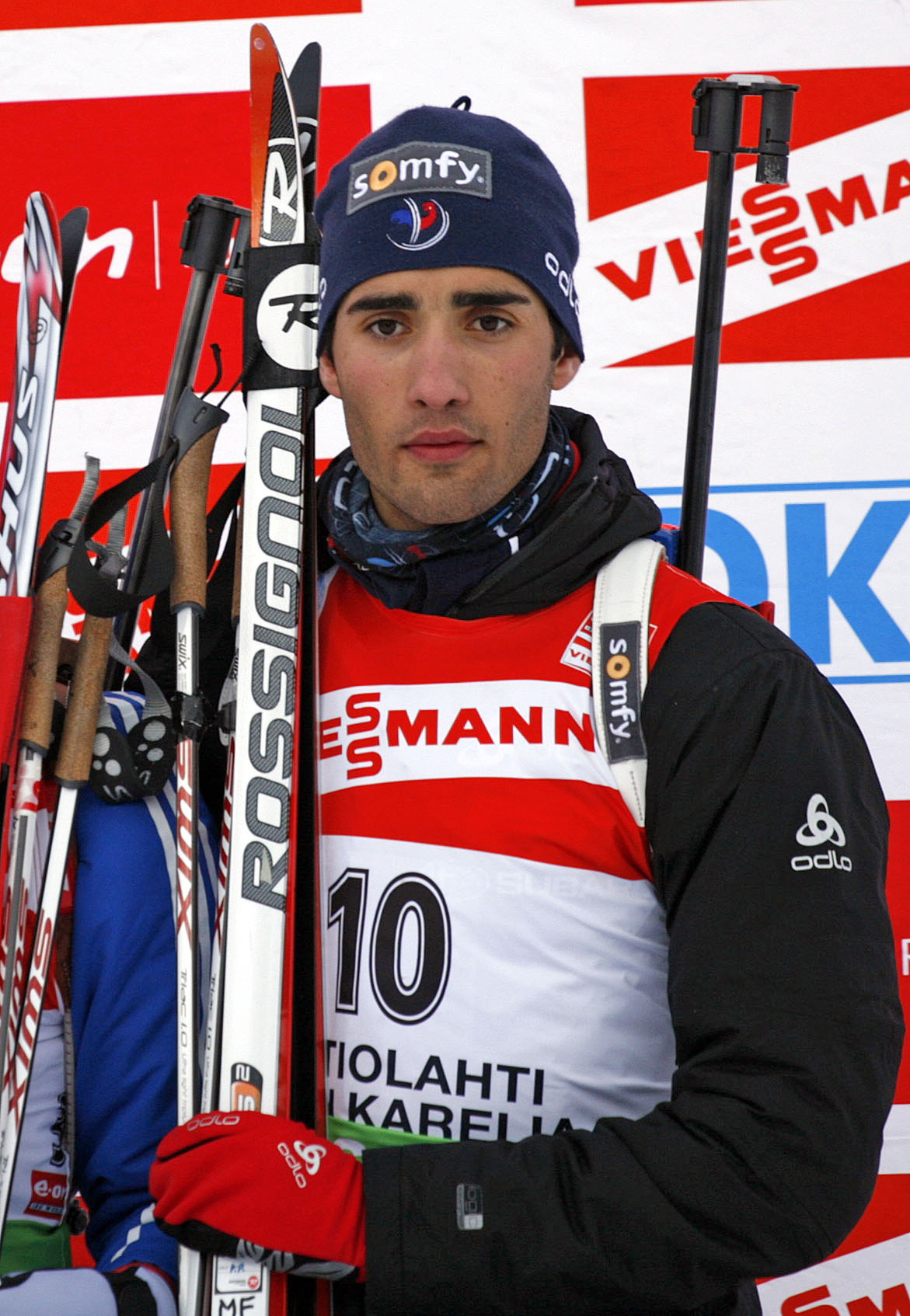
Martin Fourcade

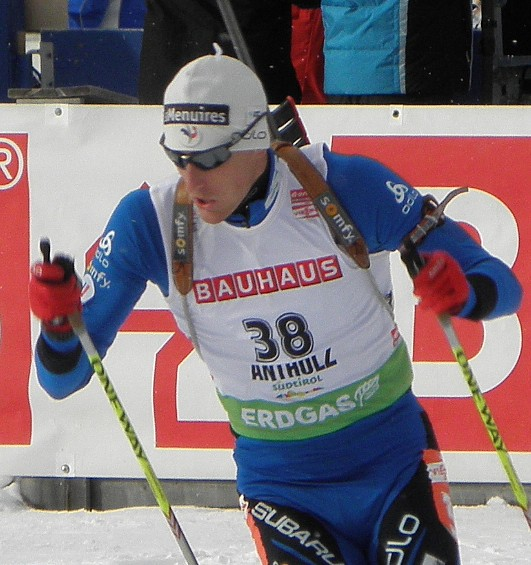
Vincent Jay

- Sandrine Bailly
- Patrice Bailly-Salins
- Florence Baverel-Robert
- Jean-Guillaume Béatrix
- Sylvie Becaert
- Anne Briand
- Marie-Laure Brunet
- Ferréol Cannard
- Véronique Claudel
- Vincent Defrasne
- Marie Dorin Habert
- Thierry Dusserre
- Hervé Flandin
- Martin Fourcade
- Delphyne Heymann
- Lionel Laurent
- Vincent Jay
- Gilles Marguet
- Corinne Niogret
- Delphyne Peretto
- Raphaël Poirée
- Julien Robert

== Bobsleigh ==
- Emmanuel Hostache
- Éric Le Chanony
- Bruno Mingeon
- Max Robert

== Cross-country skiing ==
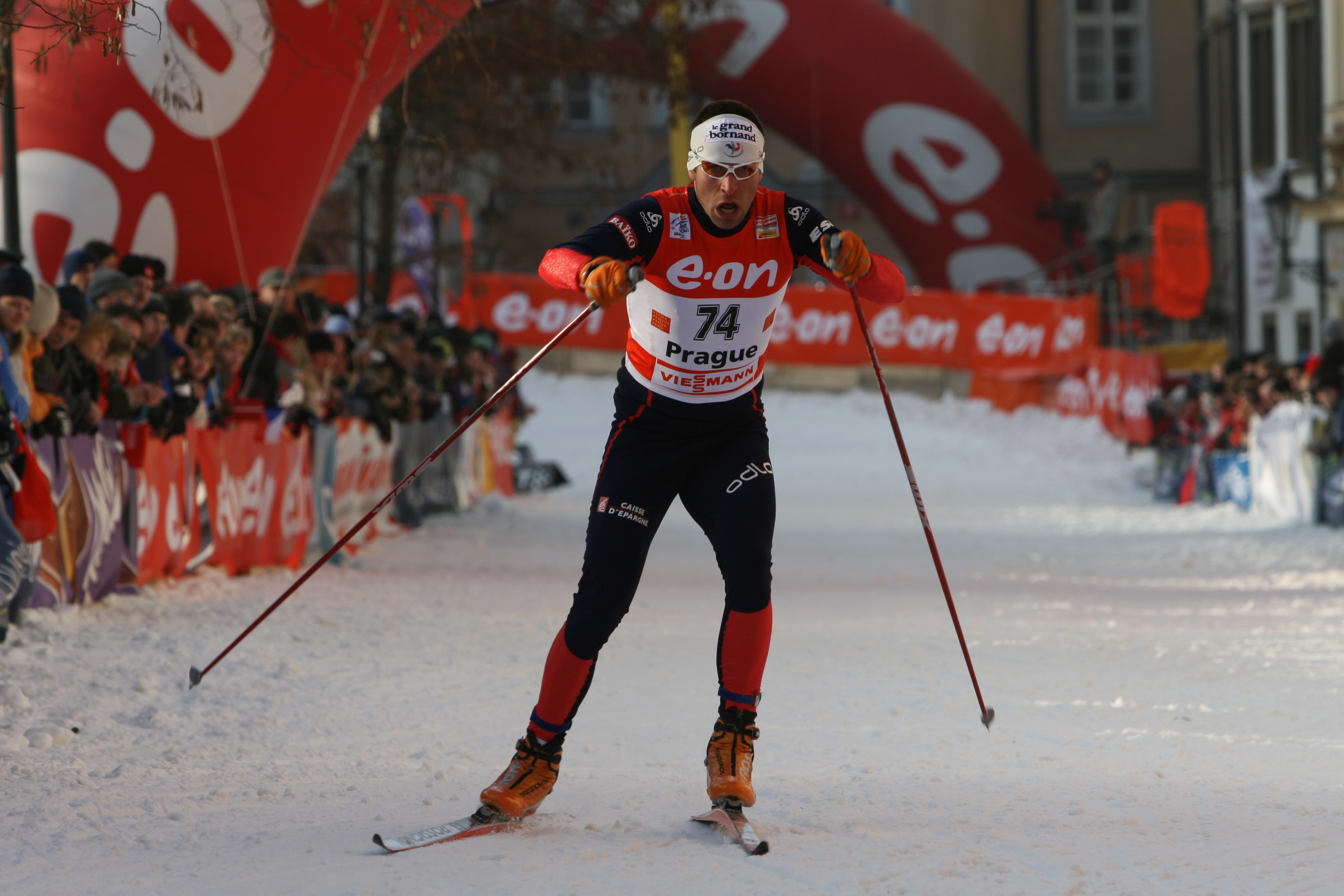
Roddy Darragon

- Roddy Darragon
- Robin Duvillard
- Jean-Marc Gaillard
- Maurice Manificat
- Ivan Perrillat Boiteux

== Curling ==
- Armand Bénédic
- Pierre Canivet
- Henri Cournollet

== Figure skating ==
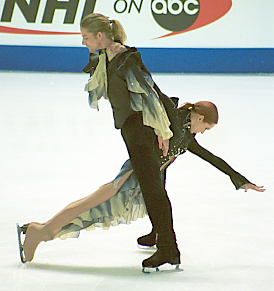
Marina Anissina and Gwendal Peizerat

- Marina Anissina
- Andrée Brunet
- Pierre Brunet
- Alain Calmat
- Philippe Candeloro
- Jacqueline du Bief
- Isabelle Duchesnay
- Paul Duchesnay
- Gwendal Peizerat
- Patrick Péra

== Freestyle skiing ==
- Olivier Allamand
- Arnaud Bovolenta
- Jean-Frédéric Chapuis
- Sébastien Foucras
- Richard Gay
- Edgar Grospiron
- Marion Josserand
- Sandra Laoura
- Marie Martinod
- Jonathan Midol
- Kevin Rolland

== Ice hockey ==
- Nicolas Arrossamena
- Yohann Auvitu
- Pierre-Édouard Bellemare
- Eliot Berthon
- Sébastien Bordeleau
- Philippe Bozon
- Stéphane Da Costa
- Teddy Da Costa
- Ludovic Garreau
- Laurent Gras
- Kévin Hecquefeuille
- Cristobal Huet
- Laurent Meunier
- Robert Ouellet
- Xavier Ouellet
- Christian Pouget
- Antoine Roussel
- Thomas Roussel
- François Rozenthal
- Maurice Rozenthal

== Judo ==
- Marc Alexandre
- Larbi Benboudaoud
- Djamel Bouras
- Jean-Claude Brondani
- Bruno Carabetta
- Christine Cicot
- Jean-Paul Coche
- Bertrand Damaisin
- Benjamin Darbelet
- Lucie Décosse
- Frédéric Demontfaucon
- David Douillet
- Gévrise Émane
- Catherine Fleury-Vachon
- Christophe Gagliano
- Priscilla Gneto
- Céline Lebrun
- Ugo Legrand
- Nathalie Lupino
- Laetitia Meignan
- Jean-Jacques Mounier
- Cécile Nowak
- Michel Nowak
- Automne Pavia
- Stéphanie Possamaï
- Marie-Claire Restoux
- Teddy Riner
- Pascal Tayot
- Audrey Tcheuméo
- Stéphane Traineau
- Séverine Vandenhende
- Patrick Vial

== Race car drivers ==
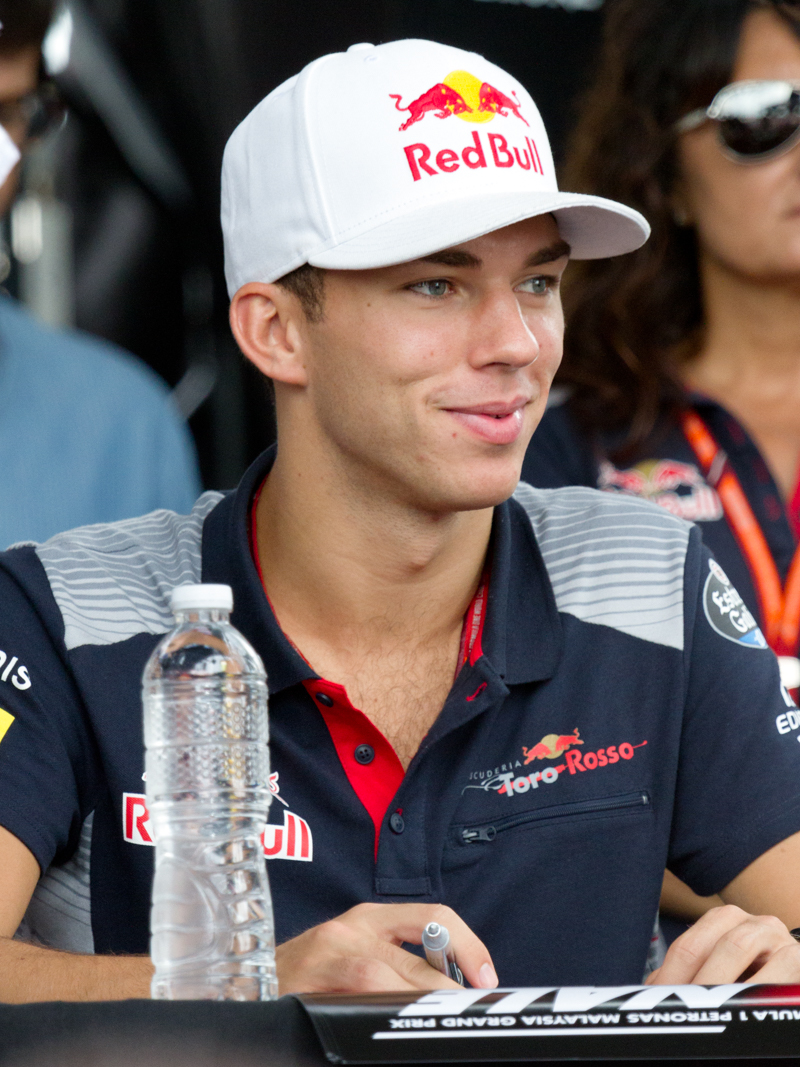
Pierre Gasly

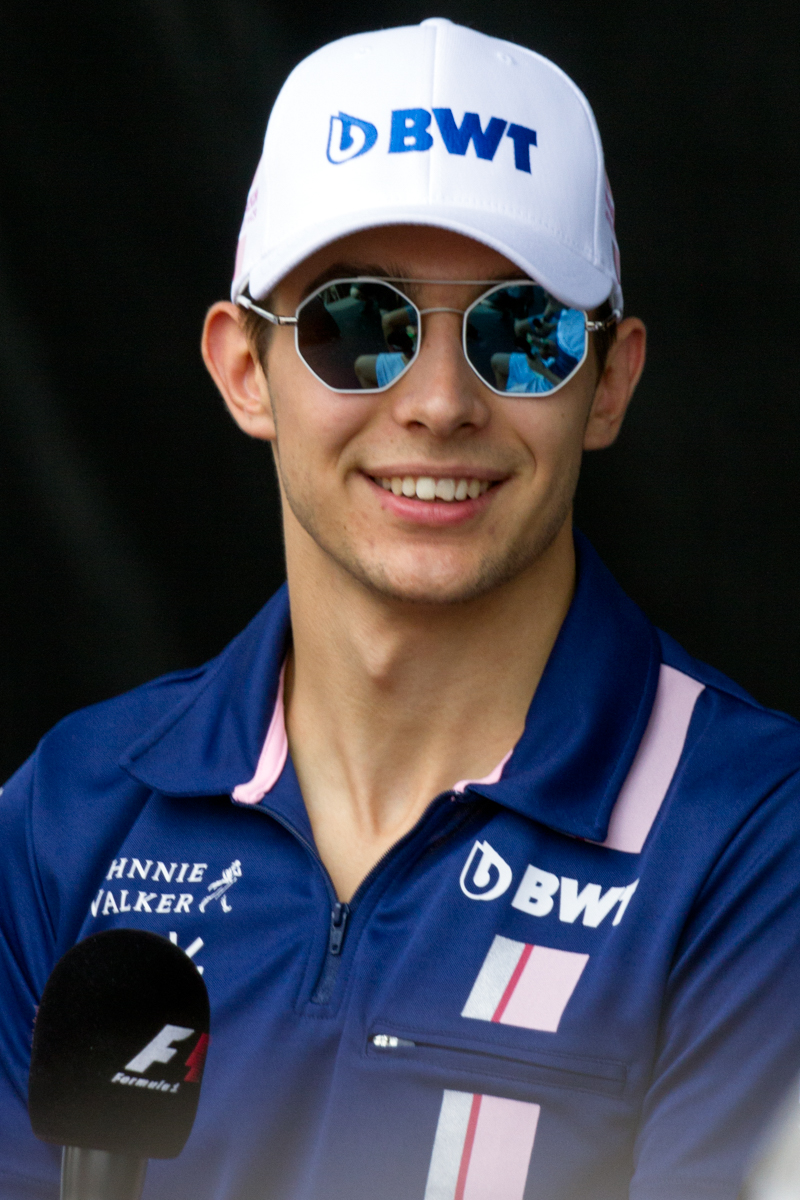
Esteban Ocon

- Laurent Aïello
- Jean Alesi
- René Arnoux
- Jean Behra
- Jean-Pierre Beltoise
- Jules Bianchi
- Sébastien Bourdais
- Julien Canal
- François Cevert
- Patrick Depailler
- Dominique Dupuy
- Loïc Duval
- Pierre Gasly
- Yves Giraud-Cabantous
- Romain Grosjean
- Jean-Pierre Jabouille
- Jacques Laffite
- Guy Ligier
- Sébastien Loeb
- Cathy Muller
- Michèle Mouton
- Esteban Ocon
- Olivier Panis
- Charles Pic
- Didier Pironi
- Alain Prost
- Jean-Louis Schlesser
- Philippe Streiff
- Patrick Tambay
- Jean Todt
- Benoît Tréluyer
- Maurice Trintignant
- Jean-Éric Vergne

== Rugby union ==
- Gillen Larrart
- Jon Elissalde
- Sébastien Morel
- Sébastien Regy

== Professional wrestling ==
- André the Giant

== Nordic combined ==
- Nicolas Bal
- Sylvain Guillaume
- Fabrice Guy
- Jason Lamy-Chappuis
- Ludovic Roux

== Rock climbing ==
- Stéphanie Bodet

== Short track speed skating ==
- Stéphanie Bouvier
- Maxime Chataignier
- Thibaut Fauconnet
- Choi Min-kyung
- Veronique Pierron

== Ski jumping ==
- Coline Mattel

== Snowboarding ==
- Déborah Anthonioz
- Mathieu Bozzetto
- Isabelle Blanc
- Paul-Henri de Le Rue
- Tony Ramoin
- Karine Ruby
- Chloé Trespeuch
- Pierre Vaultier
- Doriane Vidal

== Speed skating ==
- Alexis Contin
- Ewen Fernandez
- Benjamin Macé

== Swimming ==
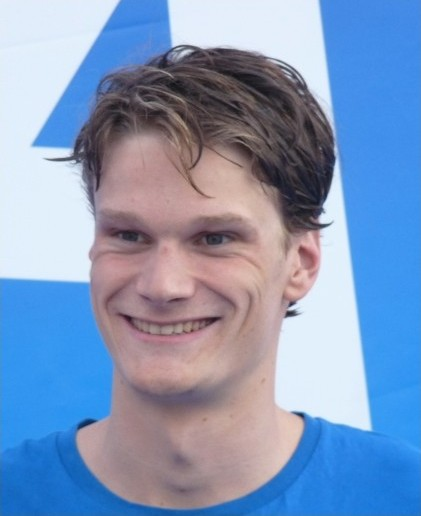
Yannick Agnel

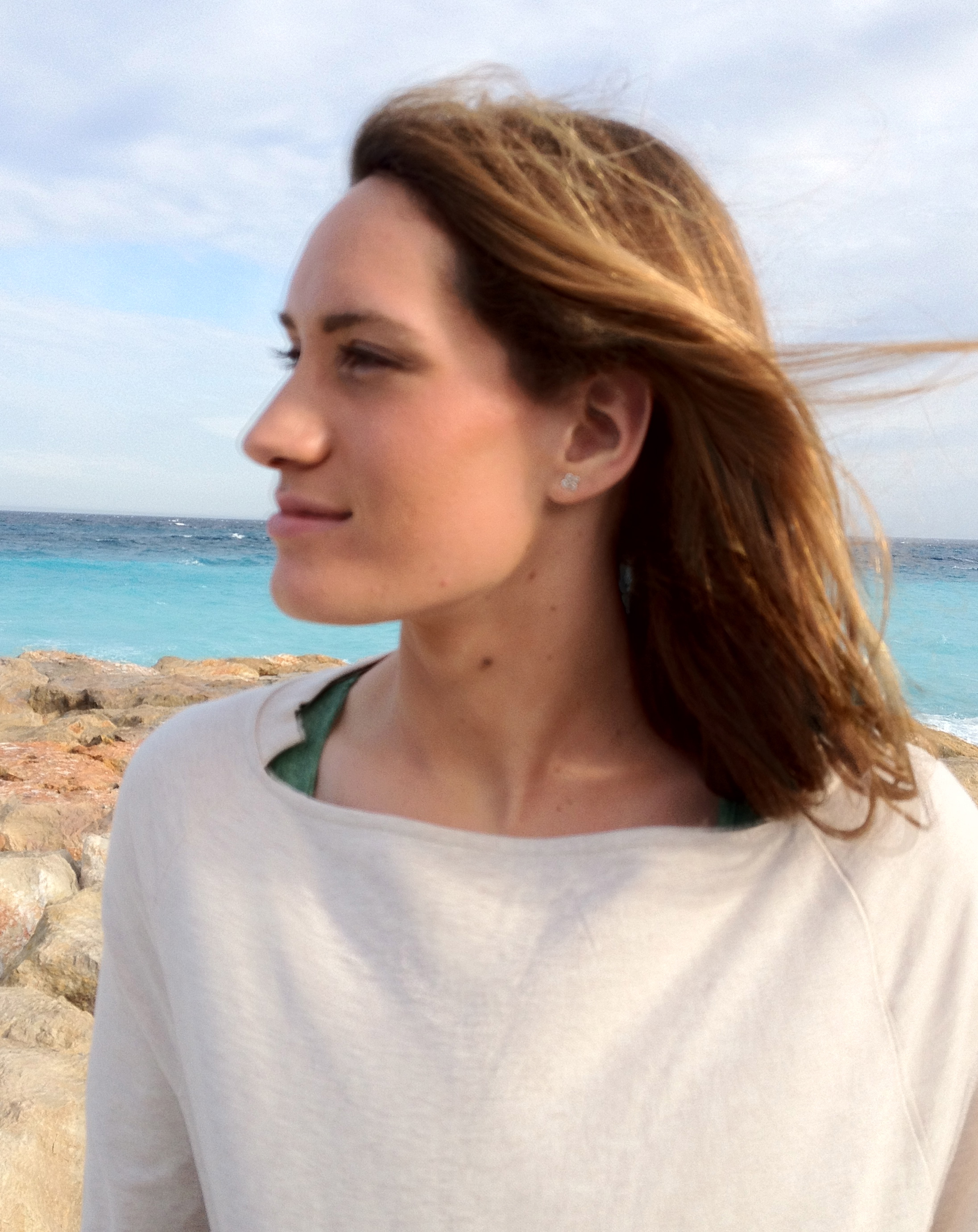
Camille Muffat

- Yannick Agnel
- Coralie Balmy
- Alain Bernard
- Joseph Bernardo
- Jean Boiteux
- Charlotte Bonnet
- Gilbert Bozon
- Frédérick Bousquet
- Kiki Caron
- Stéphan Caron
- René Cornu
- Frédéric Delcourt
- Hugues Duboscq
- Aldo Eminente
- Franck Esposito
- Ophélie-Cyrielle Étienne
- Solenne Figuès
- Fabien Gilot
- Alexandre Jany
- Clément Lefert
- Amaury Leveaux
- Grégory Mallet
- Florent Manaudou
- Leon marchand
- Roxana Maracineanu
- Malia Metella
- Alain Mosconi
- Camille Muffat
- Catherine Plewinski
- Catherine Poirot
- Boris Steimetz
- Jérémy Stravius
- Jean Taris
- Georges Vallerey Jr.
- fleur delacour

== Taekwondo ==
- Myriam Baverel
- Gwladys Épangue
- Pascal Gentil
- Anne-Caroline Graffe
- Marlène Harnois

== Tennis ==
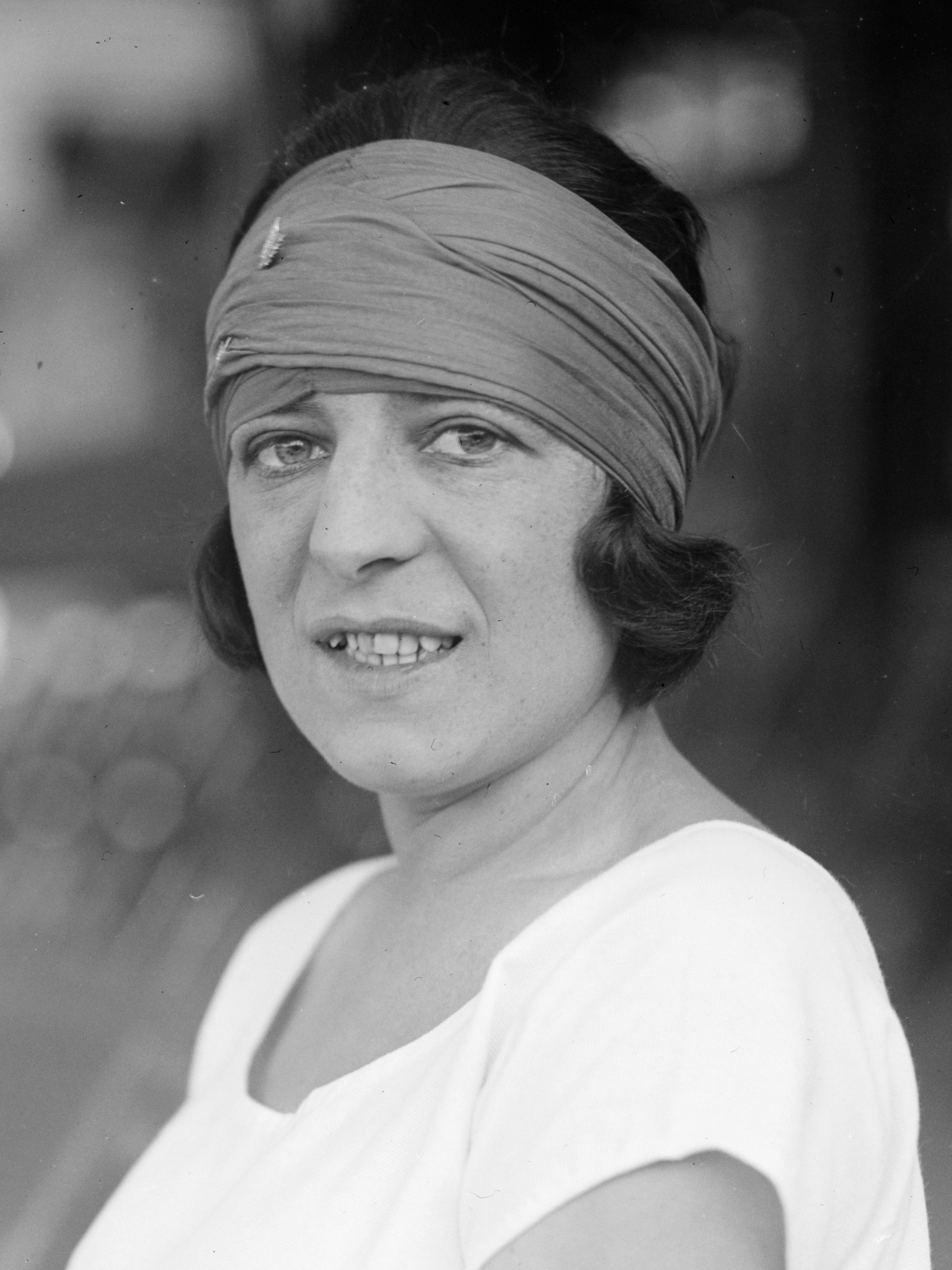
Suzanne Lenglen

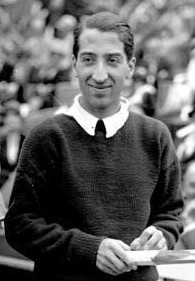
René Lacoste

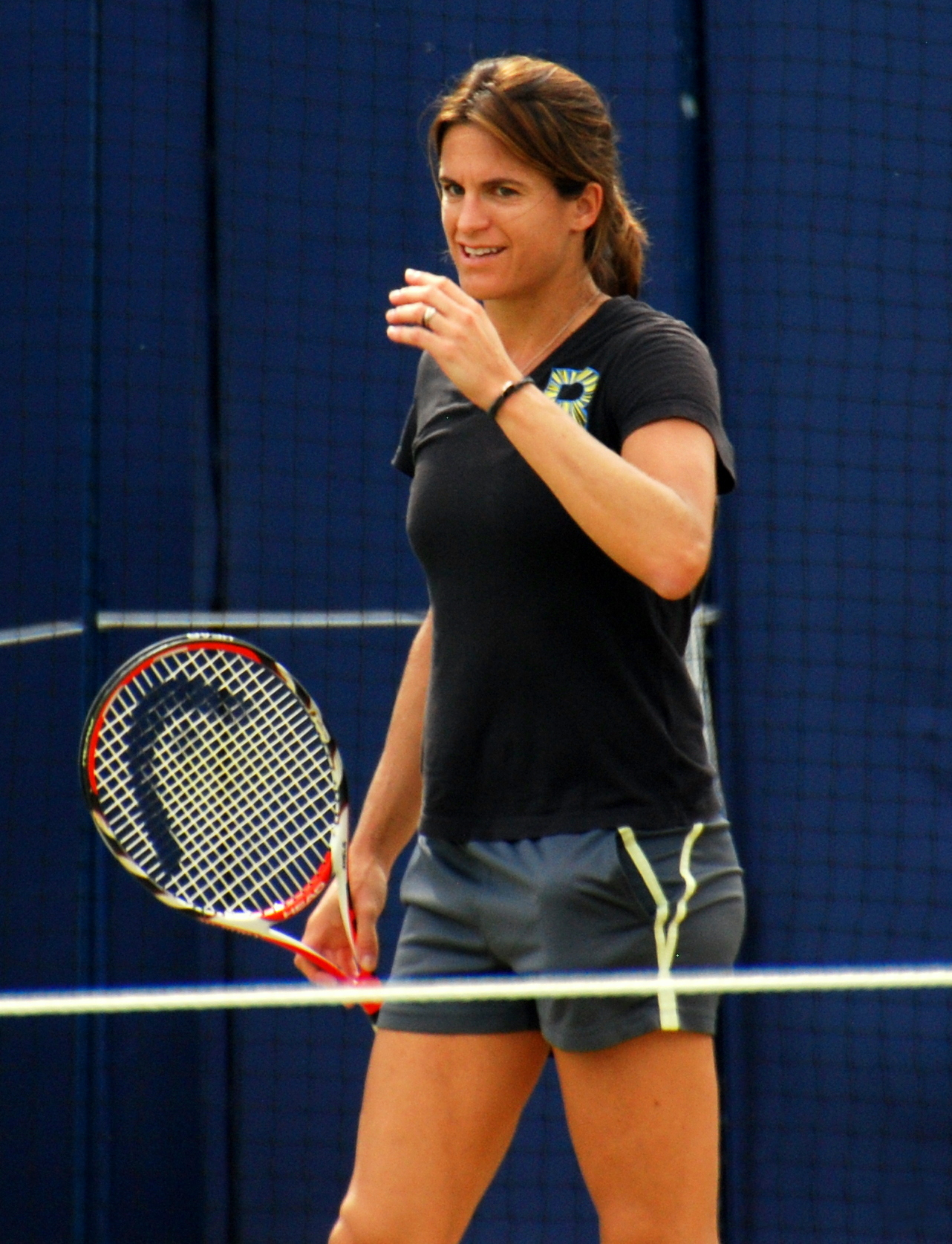
Amélie Mauresmo

- Pierre Albarran
- Paul Aymé
- Jean-Claude Barclay
- Pierre Barthès
- Marion Bartoli
- Julien Benneteau
- Marcel Bernard
- François Blanchy
- Jean Borotra
- Christian Boussus
- Marguerite Broquedis
- Jacques Brugnon
- Albert Canet
- Gail Chanfreau
- Arnaud Clément
- Henri Cochet
- Comtesse de Kermel
- Georges de la Chapelle
- Élisabeth d'Ayen
- Nathalie Dechy
- Max Decugis
- Bernard Destremau
- Arnaud Di Pasquale
- Françoise Dürr
- Richard Gasquet
- Maurice Germot
- Kate Gillou
- P. Girod
- André Gobert
- Tatiana Golovin
- Julie Halard-Decugis
- René Lacoste
- Nelly Landry
- Henri Leconte
- Suzanne Lenglen
- Michaël Llodra
- Adine Masson
- Doris Metaxa
- Jeanne Matthey
- Simonne Mathieu
- Amélie Mauresmo
- Édouard Mény de Marangue
- Kristina Mladenovic
- Gaël Monfils
- Yannick Noah
- Lolette Payot
- Yvon Petra
- Mary Pierce
- André Prévost
- Hélène Prévost
- Laurent Riboulet
- Colette Rosambert
- Fabrice Santoro
- Jean-Pierre Samazeuilh
- Jean Schopfer
- Jo-Wilfried Tsonga
- André Vacherot
- Michel Vacherot
- Édouard Roger-Vasselin
- Julie Vlasto

== Track and field ==
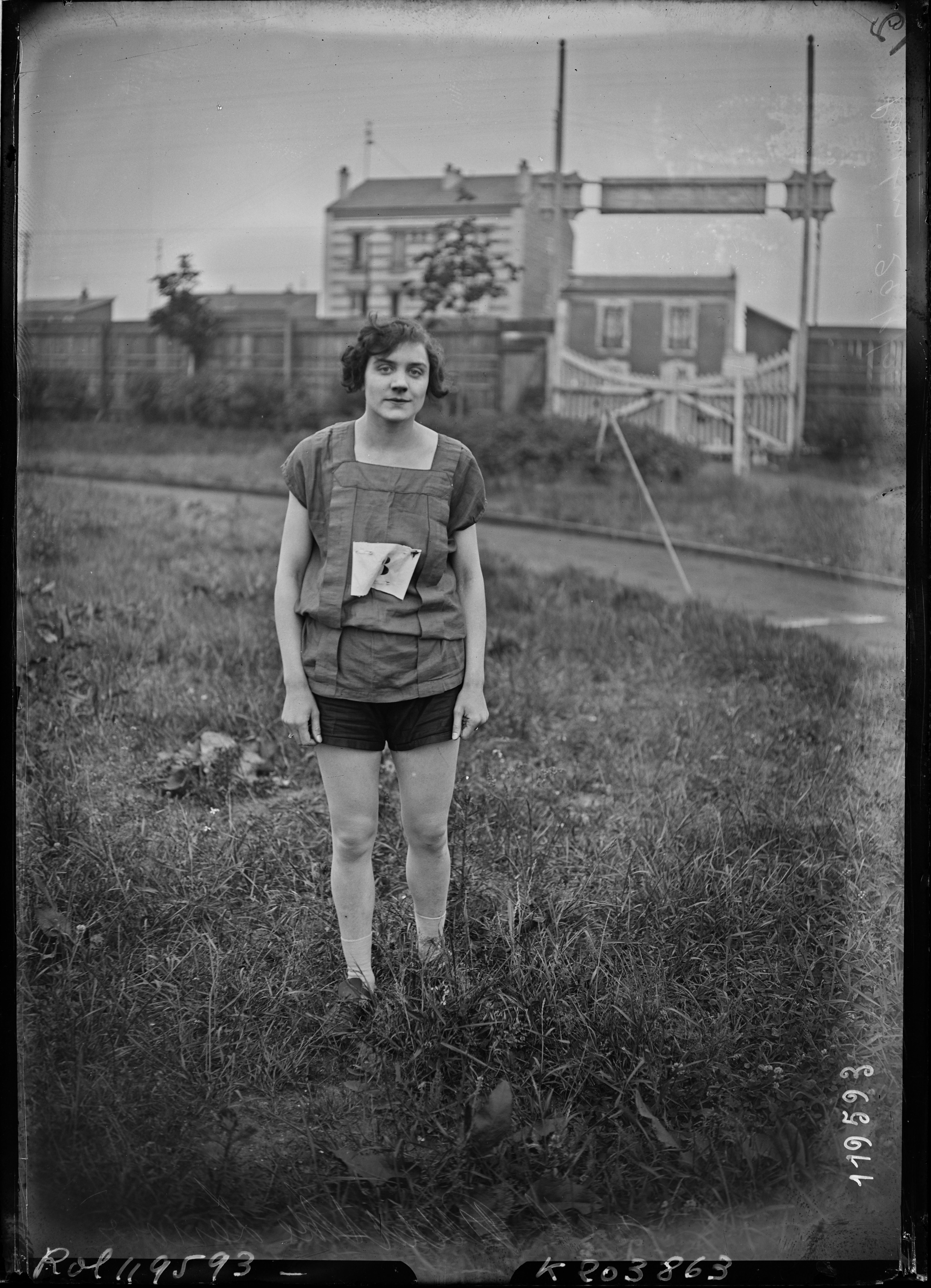
Georgette Lenoir

- Lucie Bréard
- Georgette Lenoir
- Sylvie Levecq

== See also ==
- Sport in France
- France at the Olympics
- France at the Paralympics
