= Materials science =

Research of materials

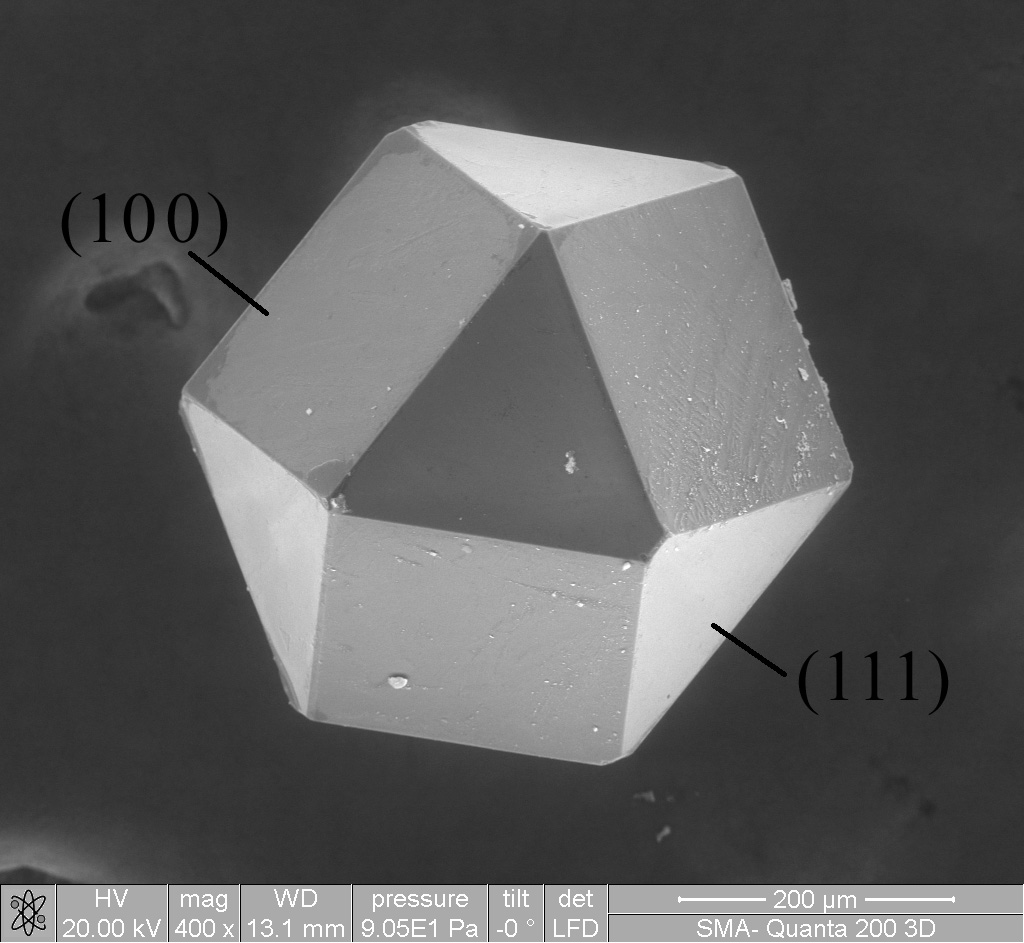
A diamond cuboctahedron showing seven crystallographic planes, imaged with scanning electron microscopy

Six classes of conventional engineering materials

Materials science and engineering is an interdisciplinary field concerned with understanding the relationships between the structure of materials and their properties and using this knowledge to design materials for specific applications. The internal structure of a material—from atomic arrangements to microscopic features—strongly influences its mechanical, electrical, thermal, and optical behavior. In engineering practice, materials science and engineering are often described through the processing–structure–properties–performance paradigm, in which processing determines structure, structure determines properties, and properties ultimately control the performance of a material in service.

The intellectual origins of materials science stem from the Age of Enlightenment, when researchers began to use analytical thinking from chemistry, physics, and engineering to understand ancient, phenomenological observations in metallurgy and mineralogy. Materials science still incorporates elements of physics, chemistry, and engineering. As such, the field was long considered by academic institutions as a sub-field of these related fields. Beginning in the 1940s, materials science began to be more widely recognized as a specific and distinct field of science and engineering, and major technical universities around the world created dedicated schools for its study.

By studying how the history of a material (processing) influences its structure, properties, and performance, materials scientists have made many contributions to new technologies in biomaterials, metallurgy, and nanotechnology. Materials science is also used by forensic engineers and failure analysts to understand why and how critical components fail, which helps prevent dangerous and costly accidents in areas such as aviation.

== History ==
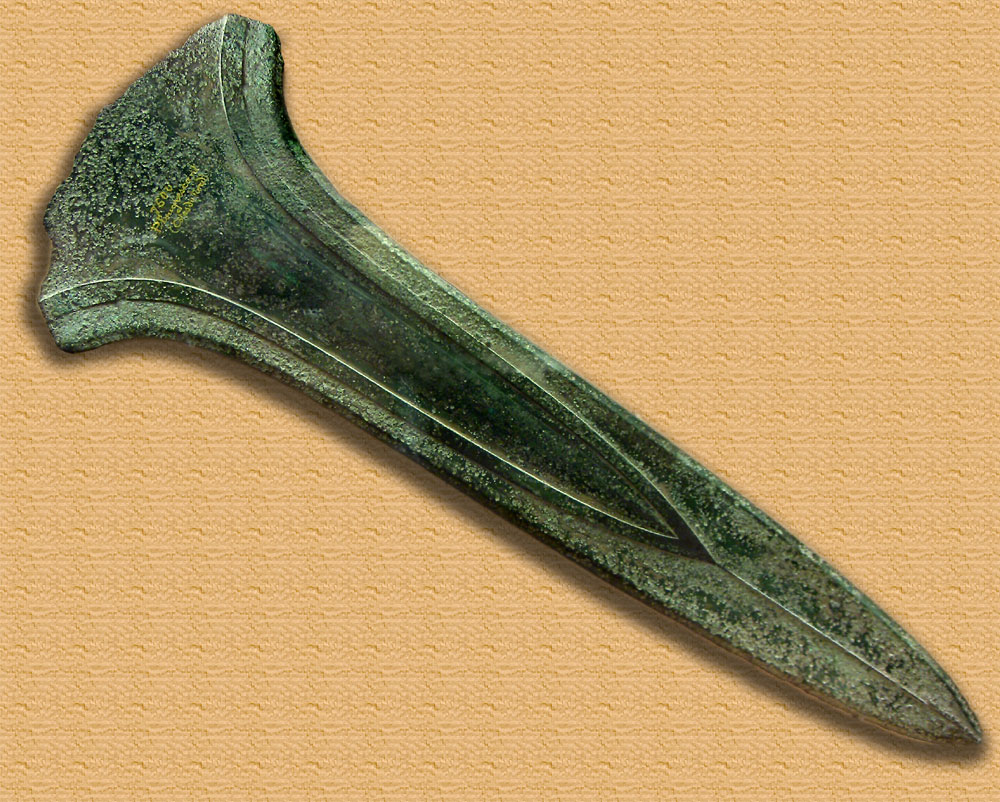
A late Bronze Age sword or dagger blade

The material of choice of a given era is often a defining point. Phases such as Stone Age, Bronze Age, Iron Age, and Steel Age are historic, if arbitrary examples. Originally deriving from the manufacture of ceramics and its putative derivative metallurgy, materials science is one of the oldest forms of engineering and applied science. Modern materials science evolved directly from metallurgy, which itself evolved from the use of fire. A major breakthrough in the understanding of materials occurred in the late 19th century, when the American scientist Josiah Willard Gibbs demonstrated that the thermodynamic properties related to atomic structure in various phases are related to the physical properties of a material. Important elements of modern materials science were products of the Space Race; the understanding and engineering of the metallic alloys, and silica and carbon materials, used in building space vehicles enabling the exploration of space. Materials science has driven, and been driven by, the development of revolutionary technologies such as rubbers, plastics, semiconductors, and biomaterials.

Before the 1960s (and in some cases decades after), many eventual materials science departments were metallurgy or ceramics engineering departments, reflecting the 19th and early 20th-century emphasis on metals and ceramics. The growth of material science in the United States was catalyzed in part by the Advanced Research Projects Agency, which funded a series of university-hosted laboratories in the early 1960s, "to expand the national program of basic research and training in the materials sciences." In comparison with mechanical engineering, the nascent material science field focused on addressing materials from the macro-level and on the approach that materials are designed on the basis of knowledge of behavior at the microscopic level. Due to the expanded knowledge of the link between atomic and molecular processes as well as the overall properties of materials, the design of materials came to be based on specific desired properties. The materials science field has since broadened to include every class of materials, including ceramics, polymers, semiconductors, magnetic materials, biomaterials, and nanomaterials, generally classified into three distinct groups: ceramics, metals, and polymers. The prominent change in materials science during the recent decades is active usage of computer simulations to find new materials, predict properties and understand phenomena.

== Fundamentals ==
The materials paradigm represented in the form of a tetrahedron (also called central paradigm of material science and engineering)

A material is defined as a substance (most often a solid, but other condensed phases can be included) that is intended to be used for certain applications. There are a myriad of materials around us; they can be found in anything from buildings and cars to spacecraft. The main classes of materials are metals, semiconductors, ceramics and polymers. New and advanced materials that are being developed include nanomaterials, biomaterials, and energy materials to name a few.

The basis of materials science is studying the interplay between the structure of materials, the processing methods to make that material, and the resulting material properties. The complex combination of these produce the performance of a material in a specific application. Many features across many length scales impact material performance, from the constituent chemical elements, its microstructure, and macroscopic features from processing. Together with the laws of thermodynamics and kinetics materials scientists aim to understand and improve materials.

=== Structure ===
Structure is one of the most important components of the field of materials science. The very definition of the field holds that it is concerned with the investigation of "the relationships that exist between the structures and properties of materials". Materials science examines the structure of materials from the atomic scale, all the way up to the macro scale. Characterization is the way materials scientists examine the structure of a material. This involves methods such as diffraction with X-rays, electrons or neutrons, and various forms of spectroscopy and chemical analysis such as Raman spectroscopy, energy-dispersive spectroscopy, chromatography, thermal analysis, electron microscope analysis, etc.

Structure is studied in the following levels.

==== Atomic structure ====
Atomic structure deals with the atoms of the materials, and how they are arranged to give rise to molecules, crystals, etc. Much of the electrical, magnetic and chemical properties of materials arise from this level of structure. The length scales involved are in angstroms (Å). The chemical bonding and atomic arrangement (crystallography) are fundamental to studying the properties and behavior of any material.

===== Bonding =====
To obtain a full understanding of the material structure and how it relates to its properties, the materials scientist must study how the different atoms, ions and molecules are arranged and bonded to each other. This involves the study and use of quantum chemistry or quantum physics. Solid-state physics, solid-state chemistry and physical chemistry are also involved in the study of bonding and structure.

===== Crystallography =====
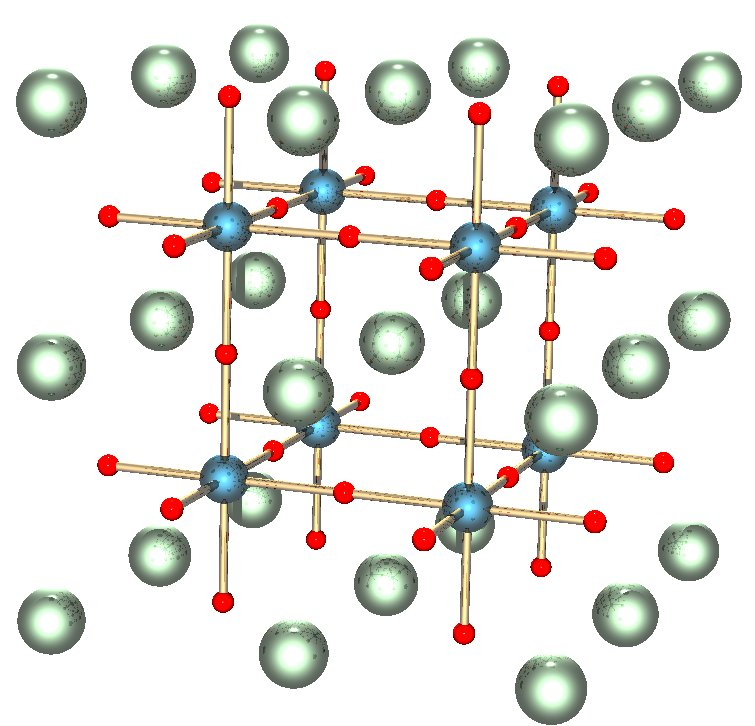
Crystal structure of a perovskite with a chemical formula ABX_{3}

Crystallography is the science that examines the arrangement of atoms in crystalline solids. Crystallography is a useful tool for materials scientists. One of the fundamental concepts regarding the crystal structure of a material includes the unit cell, which is the smallest unit of a crystal lattice (space lattice) that repeats to make up the macroscopic crystal structure. Most common structural materials include parallelepiped and hexagonal lattice types. In single crystals, the effects of the crystalline arrangement of atoms is often easy to see macroscopically, because the natural shapes of crystals reflect the atomic structure. Further, physical properties are often controlled by crystalline defects. The understanding of crystal structures is an important prerequisite for understanding crystallographic defects. Examples of crystal defects consist of dislocations including edges, screws, vacancies, self inter-stitials, and more that are linear, planar, and three dimensional types of defects. New and advanced materials that are being developed include nanomaterials, biomaterials. Mostly, materials do not occur as a single crystal, but in polycrystalline form, as an aggregate of small crystals or grains with different orientations. Because of this, the powder diffraction method, which uses diffraction patterns of polycrystalline samples with a large number of crystals, plays an important role in structural determination. Most materials have a crystalline structure, but some important materials do not exhibit regular crystal structure. Polymers display varying degrees of crystallinity, and many are completely non-crystalline. Glass, some ceramics, and many natural materials are amorphous, not possessing any long-range order in their atomic arrangements. The study of polymers combines elements of chemical and statistical thermodynamics to give thermodynamic and mechanical descriptions of physical properties.

==== Nanostructure ====
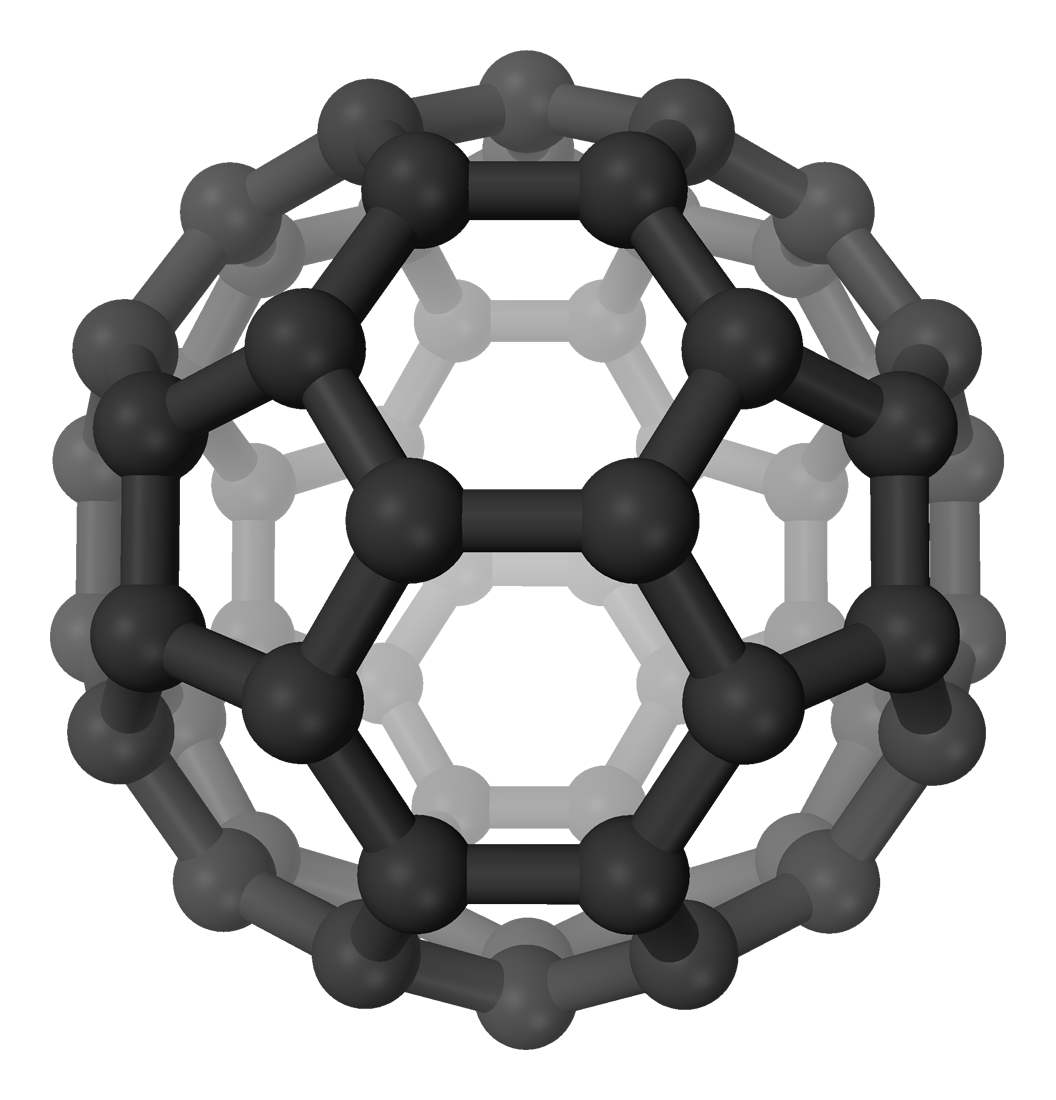
Buckminsterfullerene nanostructure

Materials, which atoms and molecules form constituents in the nanoscale (i.e., they form nanostructures) are called nanomaterials. Nanomaterials are the subject of intense research in the materials science community due to the unique properties that they exhibit.

Nanostructure deals with objects and structures that are in the 1 – 100 nm range. In many materials, atoms or molecules agglomerate to form objects at the nanoscale. This causes many interesting electrical, magnetic, optical, and mechanical properties.

In describing nanostructures, it is necessary to differentiate between the number of dimensions on the nanoscale.

Nanotextured surfaces have one dimension on the nanoscale, i.e., only the thickness of the surface of an object is between 0.1 and 100 nm.

Nanotubes have two dimensions on the nanoscale, i.e., the diameter of the tube is between 0.1 and 100 nm; its length could be much greater.

Finally, spherical nanoparticles have three dimensions on the nanoscale, i.e., the particle is between 0.1 and 100 nm in each spatial dimension. The terms nanoparticles and ultrafine particles (UFP) often are used synonymously although UFP can reach into the micrometre range. The term 'nanostructure' is often used, when referring to magnetic technology. Nanoscale structure in biology is often called ultrastructure.

==== Microstructure ====
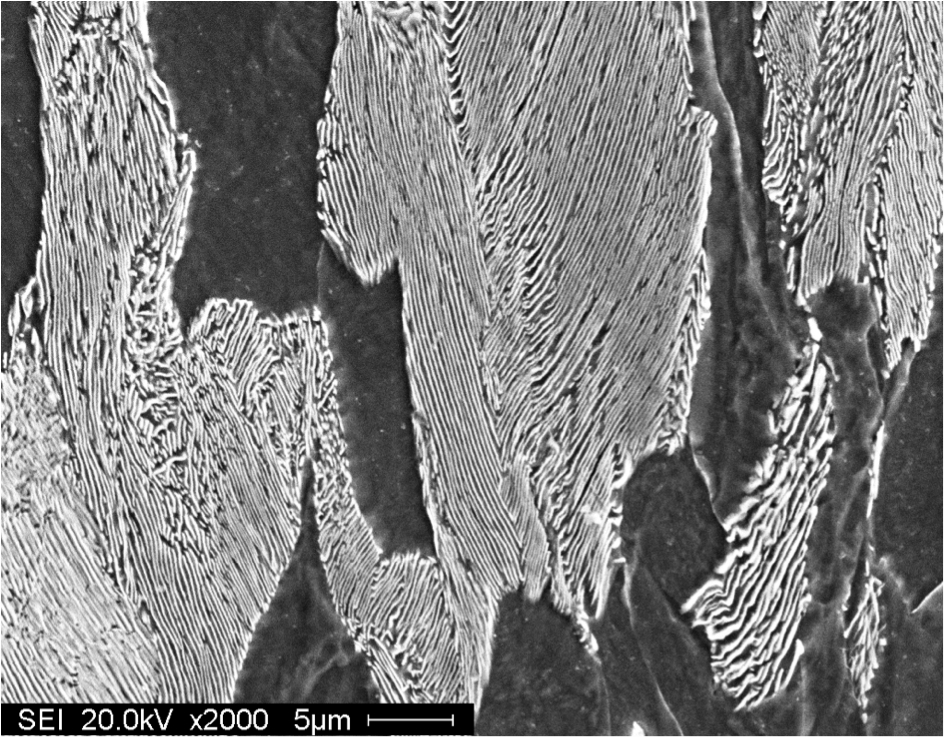
Microstructure of pearlite

Microstructure is defined as the structure of a prepared surface or thin foil of material as revealed by a microscope above 25× magnification. It deals with objects from 100 nm to a few cm. The microstructure of a material (which can be broadly classified into metallic, polymeric, ceramic and composite) can strongly influence physical properties such as strength, toughness, ductility, hardness, corrosion resistance, high/low temperature behavior, wear resistance, and so on. Most of the traditional materials (such as metals and ceramics) are microstructured.

The manufacture of a perfect crystal of a material is physically impossible. For example, any crystalline material will contain defects such as precipitates, grain boundaries (Hall–Petch relationship), vacancies, interstitial atoms or substitutional atoms. The microstructure of materials reveals these larger defects and advances in simulation have allowed an increased understanding of how defects can be used to enhance material properties.

==== Macrostructure ====
Macrostructure is the appearance of a material in the scale millimeters to meters, it is the structure of the material as seen with the naked eye.

=== Properties ===
Materials exhibit myriad properties, including the following.

- Mechanical properties, see Strength of materials
- Chemical properties, see Chemistry
- Electrical properties, see Electricity
- Thermal properties, see Thermodynamics
- Optical properties, see Optics and Photonics
- Magnetic properties, see Magnetism

The properties of a material determine its usability and hence its engineering application.

=== Processing ===
Synthesis and processing involves the creation of a material with the desired micro-nanostructure. A material cannot be used in industry if no economically viable production method for it has been developed. Therefore, developing processing methods for materials that are reasonably effective and cost-efficient is vital to the field of materials science. Different materials require different processing or synthesis methods. For example, the processing of metals has historically defined eras such as the Bronze Age and Iron Age and is studied under the branch of materials science named physical metallurgy. Chemical and physical methods are also used to synthesize other materials such as polymers, ceramics, semiconductors, and thin films. As of the early 21st century, new methods are being developed to synthesize nanomaterials such as graphene.

=== Thermodynamics ===
A phase diagram for a binary system displaying a eutectic point

Thermodynamics is concerned with heat and temperature and their relation to energy and work. It defines macroscopic variables, such as internal energy, entropy, and pressure, that partly describe a body of matter or radiation. It states that the behavior of those variables is subject to general constraints common to all materials. These general constraints are expressed in the four laws of thermodynamics. Thermodynamics describes the bulk behavior of the body, not the microscopic behaviors of the very large numbers of its microscopic constituents, such as molecules. The behavior of these microscopic particles is described by, and the laws of thermodynamics are derived from, statistical mechanics.

The study of thermodynamics is fundamental to materials science. It forms the foundation to treat general phenomena in materials science and engineering, including chemical reactions, magnetism, polarizability, and elasticity. It explains fundamental tools such as phase diagrams and concepts such as phase equilibrium.

=== Kinetics ===
Chemical kinetics is the study of the rates at which systems that are out of equilibrium change under the influence of various forces. When applied to materials science, it deals with how a material changes with time (moves from non-equilibrium to equilibrium state) due to application of a certain field. It details the rate of various processes evolving in materials including shape, size, composition and structure. Diffusion is important in the study of kinetics as this is the most common mechanism by which materials undergo change. Kinetics is essential in processing of materials because, among other things, it details how the microstructure changes with application of heat.

== Research ==
Number of works in the field of materials science in the OpenAlex database by year – in 2025, Nature reported big increases in article volume in the past two years in associated fields, noting they are closely related to the development of increasingly popular next-generation green technologies and a growing article output from particular countries and regions that prioritize the field.

Materials science is a highly active area of research. Together with materials science departments, physics, chemistry, and many engineering departments are involved in materials research. Materials research covers a broad range of topics; the following non-exhaustive list highlights a few important research areas.

=== Nanomaterials ===
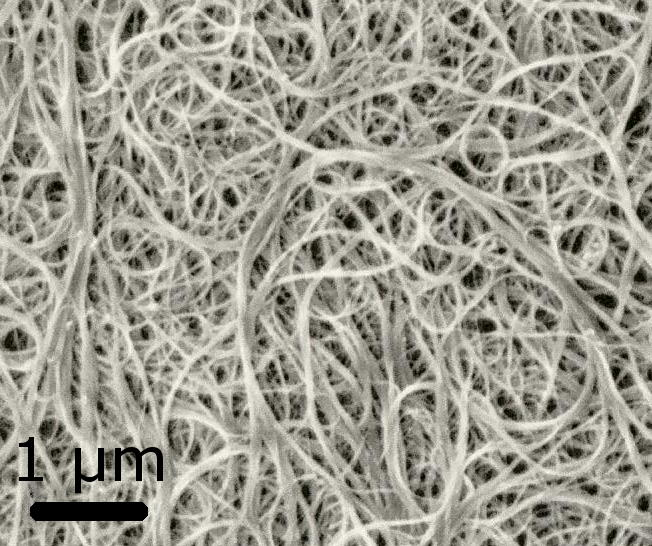
A scanning electron microscopy image of carbon nanotubes bundles

Nanomaterials describe, in principle, materials of which a single unit is sized (in at least one dimension) between 1 and 1000 nanometers (10^{−9} meter), but is usually 1 nm – 100 nm. Nanomaterials research takes a materials science based approach to nanotechnology, using advances in materials metrology and synthesis, which have been developed in support of microfabrication research. Materials with structure at the nanoscale often have unique optical, electronic, or mechanical properties. The field of nanomaterials is loosely organized, like the traditional field of chemistry, into organic (carbon-based) nanomaterials, such as fullerenes, and inorganic nanomaterials based on other elements, such as silicon. Examples of nanomaterials include fullerenes, carbon nanotubes, nanocrystals, etc.

=== Biomaterials ===
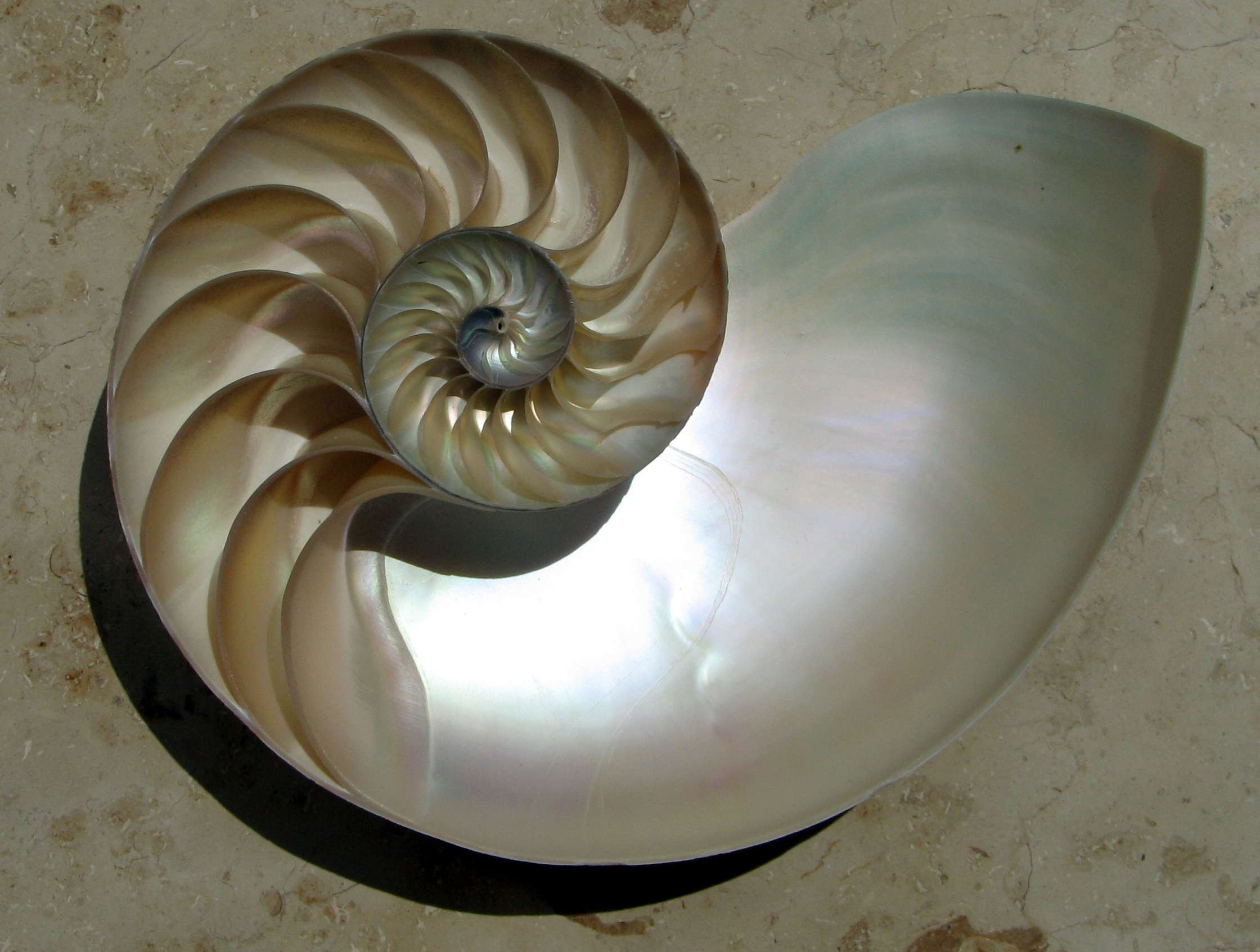
The iridescent nacre inside a nautilus shell

A biomaterial is any matter, surface, or construct that interacts with biological systems. Biomaterials science encompasses elements of medicine, biology, chemistry, tissue engineering, and materials science.

Biomaterials can be derived either from nature or synthesized in a laboratory using a variety of chemical approaches using metallic components, polymers, bioceramics, or composite materials. They are often intended or adapted for medical applications, such as biomedical devices which perform, augment, or replace a natural function. Such functions may be benign, like being used for a heart valve, or may be bioactive with a more interactive functionality such as hydroxylapatite-coated hip implants. Biomaterials are also used every day in dental applications, surgery, and drug delivery. For example, a construct with impregnated pharmaceutical products can be placed into the body, which permits the prolonged release of a drug over an extended period of time. A biomaterial may also be an autograft, allograft or xenograft used as an organ transplant material.

=== Electronic, optical, and magnetic ===
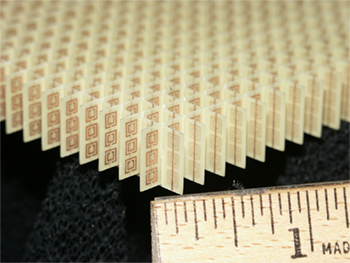
Negative index metamaterial

Semiconductors, metals, and ceramics are used today to form highly complex systems, such as integrated electronic circuits, optoelectronic devices, and magnetic and optical mass storage media.

Semiconductors are a traditional example of these types of materials. They are materials that have properties that are intermediate between conductors and insulators. Their electrical conductivities are very sensitive to the concentration of impurities, which allows the use of doping to achieve desirable electronic properties. Hence, semiconductors form the basis of the traditional computer.

This field also includes new areas of research such as superconducting materials, spintronics, metamaterials, etc. The study of these materials involves knowledge of materials science and solid-state physics or condensed matter physics.

=== Computational materials science ===
With continuing increases in computing power, simulating the behavior of materials has become possible. This enables materials scientists to understand behavior and mechanisms, design new materials, and explain properties formerly poorly understood. Efforts surrounding integrated computational materials engineering are now focusing on combining computational methods with experiments to drastically reduce the time and effort to optimize materials properties for a given application. This involves simulating materials at all length scales, using methods such as density functional theory, molecular dynamics, Monte Carlo, dislocation dynamics, phase field, finite element, and many more.

== Industry ==
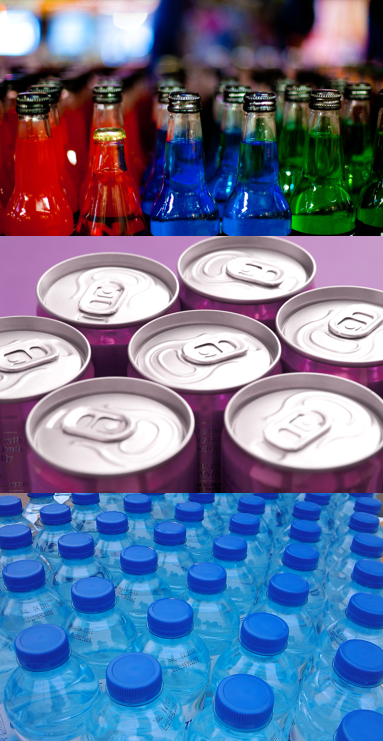
Beverage containers of all three materials types: ceramic (glass), metal (aluminum), and polymer (plastic).

Radical materials advances can drive the creation of new products or even new industries, but stable industries also employ materials scientists to make incremental improvements and troubleshoot issues with currently used materials. Industrial applications of materials science include materials design, cost-benefit tradeoffs in industrial production of materials, processing methods (casting, rolling, welding, ion implantation, crystal growth, thin-film deposition, sintering, glassblowing, etc.), and analytic methods (characterization methods such as electron microscopy, X-ray diffraction, calorimetry, nuclear microscopy (HEFIB), Rutherford backscattering, neutron diffraction, small-angle X-ray scattering (SAXS), etc.).

Besides material characterization, the material scientist or engineer also deals with extracting materials and converting them into useful forms. Thus ingot casting, foundry methods, blast furnace extraction, and electrolytic extraction are all part of the required knowledge of a materials engineer. Often the presence, absence, or variation of minute quantities of secondary elements and compounds in a bulk material will greatly affect the final properties of the materials produced. For example, steels are classified based on 1/10 and 1/100 weight percentages of the carbon and other alloying elements they contain. Thus, the extracting and purifying methods used to extract iron in a blast furnace can affect the quality of steel that is produced.

Solid materials are generally grouped into three basic classifications: ceramics, metals, and polymers. This broad classification is based on the empirical makeup and atomic structure of the solid materials, and most solids fall into one of these broad categories. An item that is often made from each of these materials types is the beverage container. The material types used for beverage containers accordingly provide different advantages and disadvantages, depending on the material used. Ceramic (glass) containers are optically transparent, impervious to the passage of carbon dioxide, relatively inexpensive, and are easily recycled, but are also heavy and fracture easily. Metal (aluminum alloy) is relatively strong, is a good barrier to the diffusion of carbon dioxide, and is easily recycled. However, the cans are opaque, expensive to produce, and are easily dented and punctured. Polymers (polyethylene plastic) are relatively strong, can be optically transparent, are inexpensive and lightweight, and can be recyclable, but are not as impervious to the passage of carbon dioxide as aluminum and glass.

=== Ceramics and glasses ===
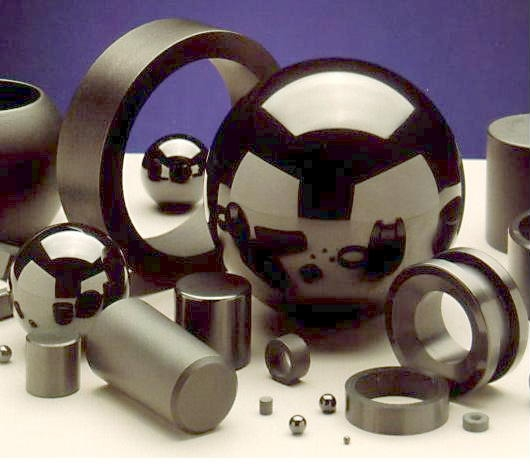
Si_{3}N_{4} ceramic bearing parts

Another application of materials science is the study of ceramics and glasses, typically the most brittle materials with industrial relevance. Many ceramics and glasses exhibit covalent or ionic-covalent bonding with SiO_{2} (silica) as a fundamental building block. Ceramics – not to be confused with raw, unfired clay – are usually seen in crystalline form. The vast majority of commercial glasses contain a metal oxide fused with silica. At the high temperatures used to prepare glass, the material is a viscous liquid which solidifies into a disordered state upon cooling. Windowpanes and eyeglasses are important examples. Fibers of glass are also used for long-range telecommunication and optical transmission. Scratch resistant Corning Gorilla Glass is a well-known example of the application of materials science to drastically improve the properties of common components.

Engineering ceramics are known for their stiffness and stability under high temperatures, compression and electrical stress. Alumina, silicon carbide, and tungsten carbide are made from a fine powder of their constituents in a process of sintering with a binder. Hot pressing provides higher density material. Chemical vapor deposition can place a film of a ceramic on another material. Cermets are ceramic particles containing some metals. The wear resistance of tools is derived from cemented carbides with the metal phase of cobalt and nickel typically added to modify properties.

Ceramics can be significantly strengthened for engineering applications using the principle of crack deflection. This process involves the strategic addition of second-phase particles within a ceramic matrix, optimizing their shape, size, and distribution to direct and control crack propagation. This approach enhances fracture toughness, paving the way for the creation of advanced, high-performance ceramics in various industries.

=== Composites ===
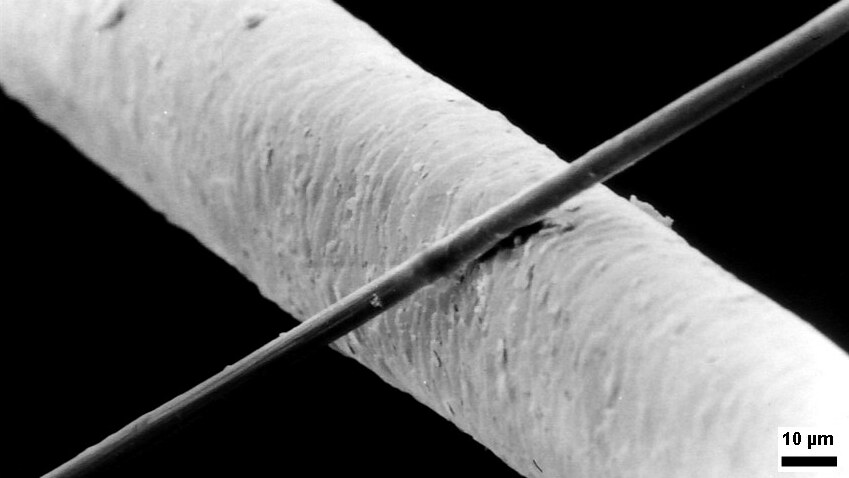
A 6 μm diameter carbon filament (running from bottom left to top right) sitting atop the much larger human hair

Another application of materials science in industry is making composite materials. These are structured materials composed of two or more macroscopic phases.

Applications range from structural elements such as steel-reinforced concrete, to the thermal insulating tiles, which play a key and integral role in NASA's Space Shuttle thermal protection system, which is used to protect the surface of the shuttle from the heat of re-entry into the Earth's atmosphere. One example is reinforced Carbon-Carbon (RCC), the light gray material, which withstands re-entry temperatures up to 1,510 °C (2,750 °F) and protects the Space Shuttle's wing leading edges and nose cap. RCC is a laminated composite material made from graphite rayon cloth and impregnated with a phenolic resin. After curing at high temperature in an autoclave, the laminate is pyrolized to convert the resin to carbon, impregnated with furfuryl alcohol in a vacuum chamber, and cured-pyrolized to convert the furfuryl alcohol to carbon. To provide oxidation resistance for reusability, the outer layers of the RCC are converted to silicon carbide.

Other examples can be seen in the "plastic" casings of television sets, cell-phones and so on. These plastic casings are usually a composite material made up of a thermoplastic matrix such as acrylonitrile butadiene styrene (ABS) in which calcium carbonate chalk, talc, glass fibers or carbon fibers have been added for added strength, bulk, or electrostatic dispersion. These additions may be termed reinforcing fibers, or dispersants, depending on their purpose.

=== Polymers ===
The repeating unit of the polymer polypropylene

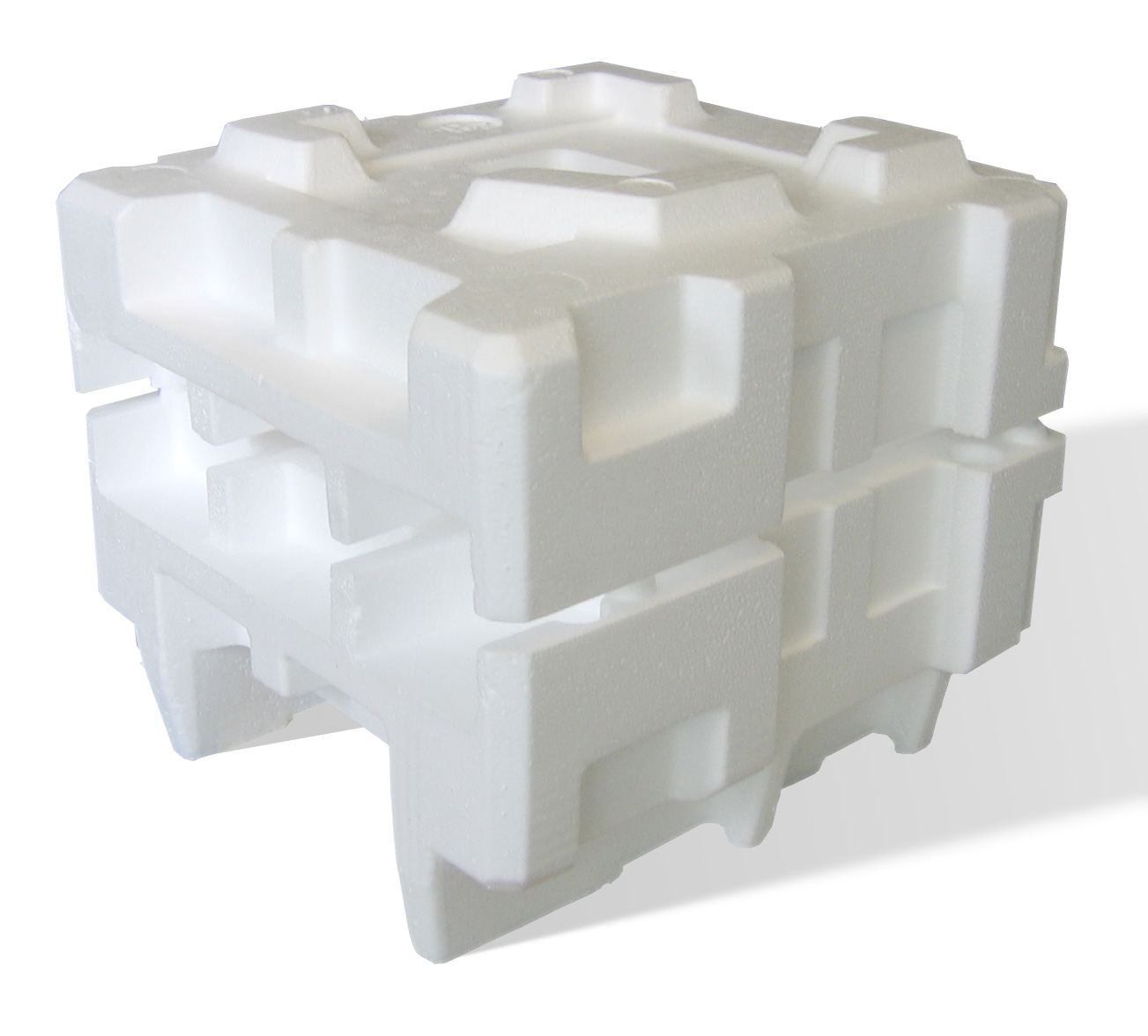
Expanded polystyrene polymer packaging

Polymers are chemical compounds made up of a large number of identical components linked together like chains. Polymers are the raw materials (the resins) used to make what are commonly called plastics and rubber. Plastics and rubber are the final product, created after one or more polymers or additives have been added to a resin during processing, which is then shaped into a final form. Plastics in former and in current widespread use include polyethylene, polypropylene, polyvinyl chloride (PVC), polystyrene, nylons, polyesters, acrylics, polyurethanes, and polycarbonates. Rubbers include natural rubber, styrene-butadiene rubber, chloroprene, and butadiene rubber. Plastics are generally classified as commodity, specialty and engineering plastics.

Polyvinyl chloride (PVC) is widely used, inexpensive, and annual production quantities are large. It lends itself to a vast array of applications, from artificial leather to electrical insulation and cabling, packaging, and containers. Its fabrication and processing are simple and well-established. The versatility of PVC is due to the wide range of plasticisers and other additives that it accepts. The term "additives" in polymer science refers to the chemicals and compounds added to the polymer base to modify its material properties.

Polycarbonate would be normally considered an engineering plastic (other examples include PEEK, ABS). Such plastics are valued for their superior strengths and other special material properties. They are usually not used for disposable applications, unlike commodity plastics.

Specialty plastics are materials with unique characteristics, such as ultra-high strength, electrical conductivity, electro-fluorescence, high thermal stability, etc.

The dividing lines between the various types of plastics is not based on material but rather on their properties and applications. For example, polyethylene (PE) is a cheap, low friction polymer commonly used to make disposable bags for shopping and trash, and is considered a commodity plastic, whereas medium-density polyethylene (MDPE) is used for underground gas and water pipes, and another variety called ultra-high-molecular-weight polyethylene (UHMWPE) is an engineering plastic which is used extensively as the glide rails for industrial equipment and the low-friction socket in implanted hip joints.

=== Metal alloys ===
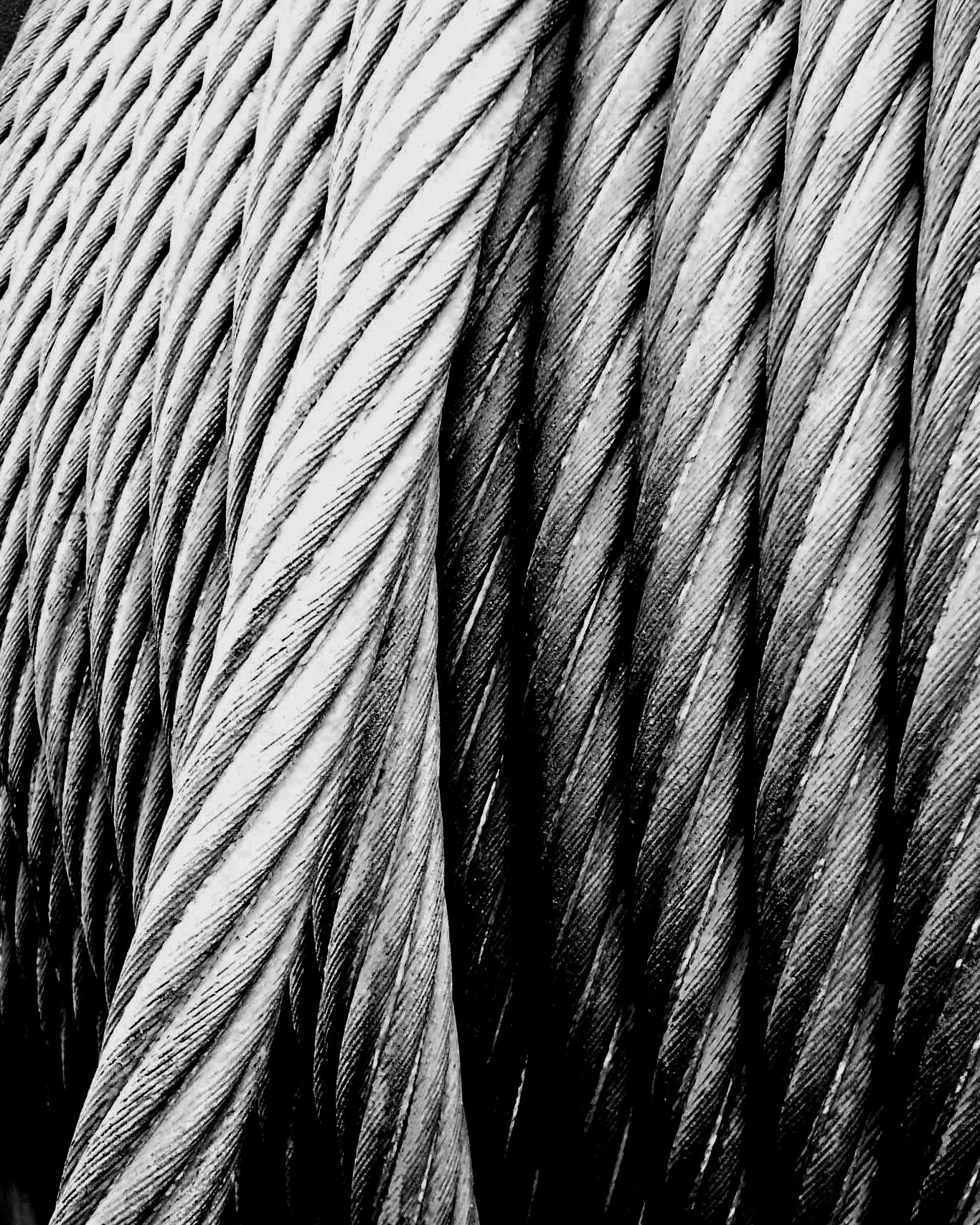
Wire rope made from steel alloy

The alloys of iron (steel, stainless steel, cast iron, tool steel, alloy steels) make up the largest proportion of metals today both by quantity and commercial value.

Iron alloyed with various proportions of carbon gives low, mid and high carbon steels. An iron-carbon alloy is only considered steel if the carbon level is between 0.01% and 2.00% by weight. For steels, the hardness and tensile strength of the steel is related to the amount of carbon present, with increasing carbon levels also leading to lower ductility and toughness. Heat treatment processes such as quenching and tempering can significantly change these properties, however. In contrast, certain metal alloys exhibit unique properties where their size and density remain unchanged across a range of temperatures. Cast iron is defined as an iron–carbon alloy with more than 2.00%, but less than 6.67% carbon. Stainless steel is defined as a regular steel alloy with greater than 10% by weight alloying content of chromium. Nickel and molybdenum are typically also added in stainless steels.

Other significant metallic alloys are those of aluminium, titanium, copper and magnesium. Copper alloys have been known for a long time (since the Bronze Age), while the alloys of the other three metals have been relatively recently developed. Due to the chemical reactivity of these metals, the electrolytic extraction processes required were only developed relatively recently. The alloys of aluminium, titanium and magnesium are also known and valued for their high strength to weight ratios and, in the case of magnesium, their ability to provide electromagnetic shielding. These materials are ideal for situations where high strength to weight ratios are more important than bulk cost, such as in the aerospace industry and certain automotive engineering applications.

=== Semiconductors ===
A semiconductor is a material that has a resistivity between a conductor and insulator. Modern day electronics run on semiconductors, and the industry had an estimated US$530 billion market in 2021. Its electronic properties can be greatly altered through intentionally introducing impurities in a process referred to as doping. Semiconductor materials are used to build diodes, transistors, light-emitting diodes (LEDs), and analog and digital electric circuits, among their many uses. Semiconductor devices have replaced thermionic devices like vacuum tubes in most applications. Semiconductor devices are manufactured both as single discrete devices and as integrated circuits (ICs), which consist of a number—from a few to millions—of devices manufactured and interconnected on a single semiconductor substrate.

Of all the semiconductors in use today, silicon makes up the largest portion both by quantity and commercial value. Monocrystalline silicon is used to produce wafers used in the semiconductor and electronics industry. Gallium arsenide (GaAs) is the second most popular semiconductor used. Due to its higher electron mobility and saturation velocity compared to silicon, it is a material of choice for high-speed electronics applications. These superior properties are compelling reasons to use GaAs circuitry in mobile phones, satellite communications, microwave point-to-point links and higher frequency radar systems. Other semiconductor materials include germanium, silicon carbide, and gallium nitride and have various applications.

== Relation with other fields ==
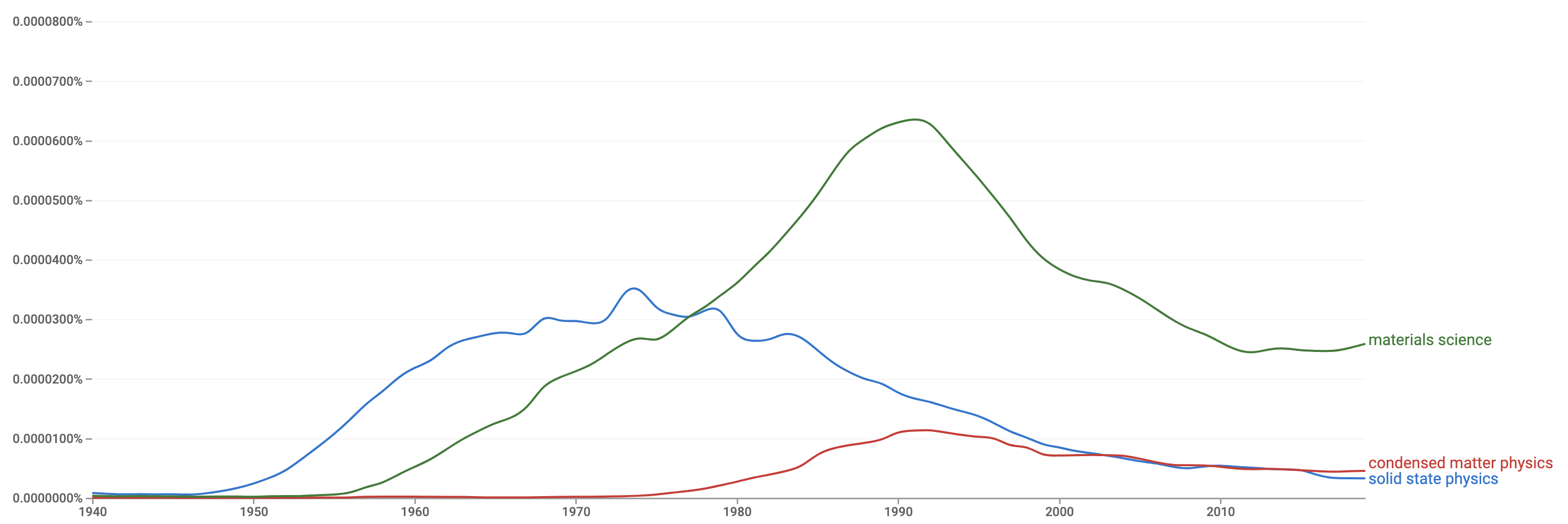
Google Ngram Viewer-diagram visualizing the search terms for complex matter terminology (1940–2018). Green: "materials science", red: "condensed matter physics" and blue: "solid state physics".

Materials science evolved, starting from the 1950s because it was recognized that to create, discover and design new materials, one had to approach it in a unified manner. Thus, materials science and engineering emerged in many ways: renaming and/or combining existing metallurgy and ceramics engineering departments; splitting from existing solid state physics research (itself growing into condensed matter physics); pulling in relatively new polymer engineering and polymer science; recombining from the previous, as well as chemistry, chemical engineering, mechanical engineering, and electrical engineering; and more.

The field of materials science and engineering is important both from a scientific perspective, as well as for applications field. Materials are of the utmost importance for engineers (or other applied fields) because usage of the appropriate materials is crucial when designing systems. As a result, materials science is an increasingly important part of an engineer's education.

Materials physics is the use of physics to describe the physical properties of materials. It is a synthesis of physical sciences such as chemistry, solid mechanics, solid state physics, and materials science. Materials physics is considered a subset of condensed matter physics and applies fundamental condensed matter concepts to complex multiphase media, including materials of technological interest. Current fields that materials physicists work in include electronic, optical, and magnetic materials, novel materials and structures, quantum phenomena in materials, nonequilibrium physics, and soft condensed matter physics. New experimental and computational tools are constantly improving how materials systems are modeled and studied and are also fields when materials physicists work in.

The field is inherently interdisciplinary, and the materials scientists or engineers must be aware and make use of the methods of the physicist, chemist and engineer. Conversely, fields such as life sciences and archaeology can inspire the development of new materials and processes, in bioinspired and paleoinspired approaches. Thus, there remain close relationships with these fields. Conversely, many physicists, chemists and engineers find themselves working in materials science due to the significant overlaps between the fields.

== Emerging technologies ==
Emerging technology	Status	Potentially marginalized technologies	Potential applications	Related articles
Aerogel	Hypothetical, experiments, diffusion, early uses	Traditional insulation, glass	Improved insulation, insulative glass if it can be made clear, sleeves for oil pipelines, aerospace, high-heat & extreme cold applications	
Amorphous metal	Experiments	Kevlar	Armor	
Conductive polymers	Research, experiments, prototypes	Conductors	Lighter and cheaper wires, antistatic materials, organic solar cells	
Femtotechnology, picotechnology	Hypothetical	Present nuclear	New materials; nuclear weapons, power	
Fullerene	Experiments, diffusion	Synthetic diamond and carbon nanotubes (Buckypaper)	Programmable matter	
Graphene	Hypothetical, experiments, diffusion, early uses	Silicon-based integrated circuit	Components with higher strength to weight ratios, transistors that operate at higher frequency, lower cost of display screens in mobile devices, storing hydrogen for fuel cell powered cars, filtration systems, longer-lasting and faster-charging batteries, sensors to diagnose diseases	Potential applications of graphene
High-temperature superconductivity	Cryogenic receiver front-end (CRFE) RF and microwave filter systems for mobile phone base stations; prototypes in dry ice; Hypothetical and experiments for higher temperatures	Copper wire, semiconductor integral circuits	No loss conductors, frictionless bearings, magnetic levitation, lossless high-capacity accumulators, electric cars, heat-free integral circuits and processors	
LiTraCon	Experiments, already used to make Europe Gate	Glass	Building skyscrapers, towers, and sculptures like Europe Gate	
Metamaterials	Hypothetical, experiments, diffusion	Classical optics	Microscopes, cameras, metamaterial cloaking, cloaking devices	
Metal foam	Research, commercialization	Hulls	Space colonies, floating cities	
Multi function structures	Hypothetical, experiments, some prototypes, few commercial	Composite materials	Wide range, e.g., self-health monitoring, self-healing material, morphing	
Nanomaterials: carbon nanotubes	Hypothetical, experiments, diffusion, early uses	Structural steel and aluminium	Stronger, lighter materials, the space elevator	Potential applications of carbon nanotubes, carbon fiber
Programmable matter	Hypothetical, experiments	Coatings, catalysts	Wide range, e.g., claytronics, synthetic biology	
Quantum dots	Research, experiments, prototypes	LCD, LED	Quantum dot laser, future use as programmable matter in display technologies (TV, projection), optical data communications (high-speed data transmission), medicine (laser scalpel)	
Silicene	Hypothetical, research	Field-effect transistors		

== Subdisciplines ==
The main branches of materials science stem from the four main classes of materials: ceramics, metals, polymers and composites.

- Ceramic engineering
- Metallurgy
- Polymer science and engineering
- Composite engineering

There are additionally broadly applicable, materials independent, endeavors.

- Materials characterization (spectroscopy, microscopy, diffraction)
- Computational materials science
- Materials informatics and selection

There are also relatively broad focuses across materials on specific phenomena and techniques.

- Crystallography
- Surface science
- Tribology
- Microelectronics

== Related or interdisciplinary fields ==
- Condensed matter physics, solid-state physics and solid-state chemistry
- Nanotechnology
- Mineralogy
- Supramolecular chemistry
- Biomaterials science
- Materials informatics

== Professional societies ==
- American Ceramic Society
- ASM International
- Association for Iron and Steel Technology
- Materials Research Society
- The Minerals, Metals & Materials Society
- Institute of Materials, Minerals and Mining, UK

== See also ==
- Bio-based material
- Bioplastic
- Forensic materials engineering
- List of computational materials science software
- List of emerging materials science technologies
- List of materials science journals
- List of materials analysis methods
- Materials science in science fiction
- Physical chemistry
- Timeline of materials technology
