= Cassese =

Cassese is a surname. Notable people with the surname include:

- Andrew Cassese (born 1972), American actor and musician
- Antonio Cassese (1937–2011), Italian jurist
- Cyril Cassese (born 1972), French footballer
- Kevin Cassese (born 1981), American lacrosse player
- Sabino Cassese (born 1935), Italian judge and law professor
- Tom Cassese (born 1946), American football player

== See also ==
- Joseph Cassese House
