= Chevallereau =

Chevallereau is a French surname. Notable people with the surname include:

- Christine Chevallereau (born 1961), French roboticist
- David Chevallereau (born 1969), French footballer
- Jacques-René Chevallereau de La Gaubardière (1750–1823), French politician
