= Christine Chevallereau =

French roboticist

Christine Chevallereau (born 1961) is a French roboticist. Her research investigates the control theory of robot locomotion for bipedal robots, the application of tensegrity structures in understanding how birds can stand stably while sleeping, and the use of bird models as bioinspiration in robotics. She is a director of research for the French National Centre for Scientific Research (CNRS), affiliated with the Laboratoire des sciences du numérique de Nantes (LS2N).

Chevallereau received her Ph.D. in 1988 from Nantes University. Her dissertation, Contribution à la commande dynamique de robots dans l'espace opérationnel, was supervised by Wisama Khalil. She joined CNRS in 1989 and, after receiving a habilitation, became a director of research in 2006.

She received the CNRS Silver Medal in 2025.
