= Hassanipour =

Hassanipour is an Iranian surname. Notable people with the surname include:

- Fatemeh Hassanipour (fl. 1998), Iranian-American mechanical engineer;
- Saeid Hassanipour (born 1988), Iranian karateka.
