= Fort Monostor =

Fort near Komárom, Hungary

Coordinates: 47°45′04″N 18°05′44.5″E

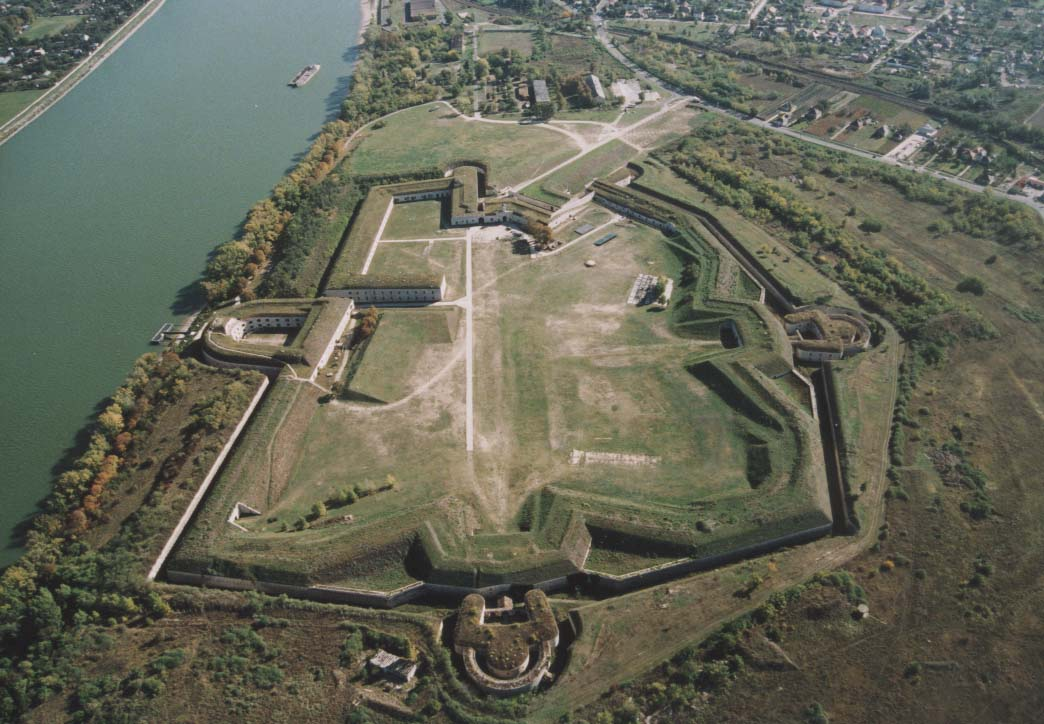
Fort Monostor

Fort Monostor (Hungarian: Monostori Erőd) (also referred to as Fort Sandberg) is a fort situated close to the city of Komárom, Hungary. It was built between 1850 and 1871 like part of the fortification system of Komárom. After World War II the Soviets built the biggest ammunition storage in the Fortress of Monostor. Thousands of wagons of ammunition were forwarded from the strictly guarded objects. One of a series of forts in the area, Monostor is open to the public as a museum. It also hosts Europe Gate, a sculpture made of light-transmitting concrete.

== Film and TV ==
Fort Monostor was used as a filming location in the HBO's Strike Back (S03E09) and the second season of Netflix's Shadow And Bone.

== See also ==
- Komárom
- Komarno
- Komárno fortification system
