= Translucent concrete =

Concrete-based building material which lets through light

Translucent concrete (also: light-transmitting concrete) is a concrete based building material with light-transmissive properties due to embedded light optical elements — usually optical fibers. Light is conducted through the stone from one end to the other. Therefore, the fibers have to go through the whole object. This results in a certain light pattern on the other surface, depending on the fiber structure. Shadows cast onto one side appear as silhouettes through the material.

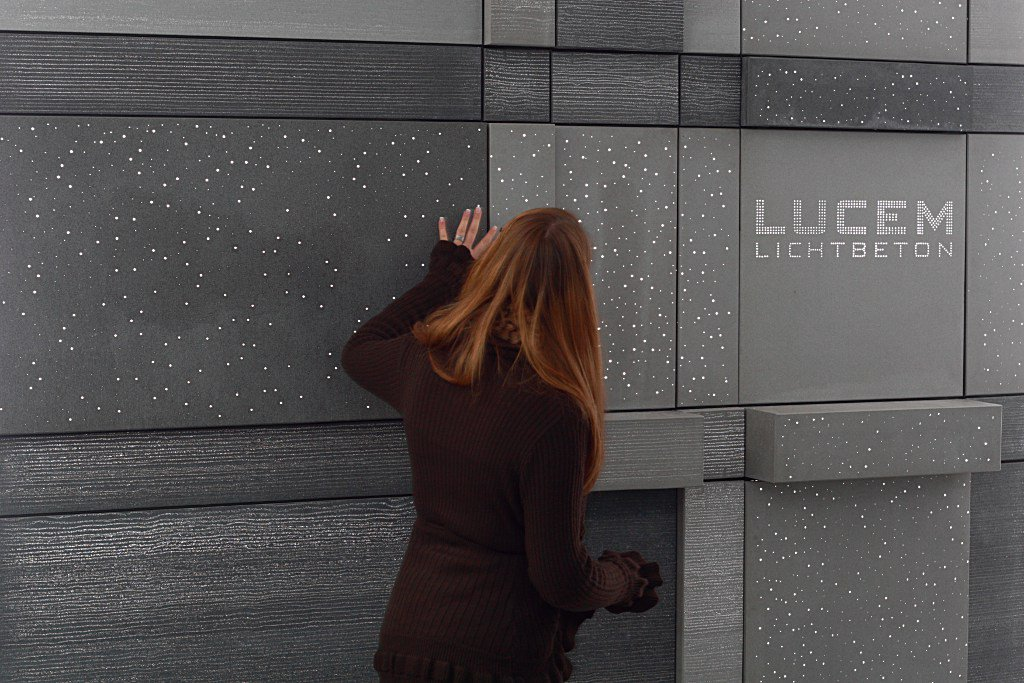
Translucent concrete at Expo Bau 2011, München/Germany

Translucent concrete is used in fine architecture as a façade material and for the cladding of interior walls. Light-transmitting concrete has also been applied to various design products.

Several ways of producing translucent concrete exist. All are based on a fine grain concrete (ca. 95%) and only 5% light conducting elements that are added during the casting process. After setting, the concrete is cut to plates or stones with standard machinery for cutting stone materials.

Due to bends in the fibers and roughnesses on the cut surfaces of the fibers, light transmission is generally a bit less than half the incident light on the fibers, so given five percent fibers, about two percent. As the human eye's response to light is non-linear, this can still give useful daylighting.

In theory, the fibers could carry light around corners and over a distance of tens of meters, with the rate of loss increasing with length depending on the type of fiber and how it is bent.

Working with natural light, it has to be ensured that enough light is available. Wall mounting systems need to be equipped with some form of lighting, designed to achieve uniform illumination on the full plate surface. Usually mounting systems similar to natural stone panels are used — e.g., LUCEM uses perforated mounting with visible screws, undercut anchors with agraffes or façade anchors.

== History ==
Translucent concrete has been first mentioned in a 1935 Canadian patent. But since the development of optical glass fibres and polymer based optical fibers the rate of inventions and developments in this field has drastically increased. There have also been inventions that apply this concept to more technical applications like fissure detection. In the early 1990s forms like translucent concrete products popular today with fine & layered patterns were developed.

Today several companies produce translucent concrete with very different production systems. Some manufacturers are:

- Florak Bauunternehmung GmbH, Heinsberg/Germany
- LBM EFO, Berching/Germany
- LiTraCon Bt, Csongrád/Hungary
- LUCEM GmbH, Aachen/Germany
- Luccon Lichtbeton GmbH, Klaus/Austria
- LiCrete, by Gravelli/Czech Republic

== Variants ==
Apart from fine fiber patterns due to the use of optical fibers or textiles some products with much coarser light pattern are available. The main advantage of these products is that on large scale objects the texture is still visible — while the texture of finer translucent concrete becomes indistinct at distance. Further pictograms and lettering can be realized with this technology.

An approach that does not use waveguides involves using transparent aggregate and binders. However, chemically this would not necessarily resemble concrete, and might resemble fiberglass. Unlike materials requiring alignment of optical fibers, however, it might be transported and poured using existing infrastructure.

== See also ==
- Bottle wall (larger-scale translucent elements)
- Glass brick (larger-scale translucent elements, minimal concrete grout)
- LiTraCon (brand of fiberoptic concrete)
- Daylighting
