= Fatemeh Hassanipour =

Iranian-American mechanical engineer

Fatemeh Hassanipour is an Iranian-American mechanical engineer whose research involves heat transfer and fluid mechanics, with applications ranging from solar water heating and bio-inspired heat exchangers to modeling the human breast in lactation and using infrared imaging to diagnose breast cancer. She is a professor of mechanical engineering at the University of Texas at Dallas.

== Education and career ==
Hassanipour has a 1998 bachelor's degree in mechanical engineering from the University of Tehran. She worked as a pipe stress engineer in oil extraction in Iran, as a consultant in Germany, in engineering management in France, and in heating, ventilation, and air conditioning in the US, before continuing her graduate education at Southern Methodist University. She completed her Ph.D. in 2009; her doctoral dissertation, A Particulate-flow Heat Exchanger Inspired by Gas Diffusion in Lung Capillaries, was supervised by José L. Lage. In the same year she joined the faculty at the University of Texas at Dallas.

== Recognition ==
The North Texas section of the American Society of Mechanical Engineers (ASME) named Hassanipour as their Young Engineer of the Year in 2009. She received a National Science Foundation CAREER Award in 2015. In 2024, she was named as an ASME Fellow.
