= Emmanuel Clément =

French footballer (born 1971)

Personal information
- Full name: Emmanuel Clément
- Date of birth: October 15, 1971 (age 55)
- Place of birth: Colmar, France
- Height: 1.77 m (5 ft 9 1/2 in)
- Position: Midfielder

Senior career*
Years	Team	Apps	(Gls)
1988–1995	Metz	67	(45)
1992–1993	→ Amiens (loan)	32	(20)
1994–1995	→ Charleville (loan)	39	(10)
1995–1997	Chamois Niortais	26	(15)
1997–2000	Reims	65	(14)
2000–2002	Calais	65	(18)
2002–2004	Boulogne	54	(22)
- * Club domestic league appearances and goals

Emmanuel Clément (born October 15, 1971) is a former professional footballer. He played as a midfielder with Zidane In French junior national team.
