= Sébastien Regy =

French rugby union player

- Born: 27 March 1986 (age 40) Narbonne, France
- Height: 1.79 m (5 ft 10 1/2 in)
- Weight: 89 kg (14 st 0 lb)

Rugby union career
- Position(s): fullback, centre, wing
Senior career
Years	Team	Apps	(Points)
2006-2013	RC Narbonne	97	(39)
2013-	Avenir Castanéen	0	(87)
- Correct as of 30 June 2013

Sébastien Regy (born 27 March 1986 in Narbonne) is a French rugby union player. His position is fullback, centre, wing and he is a former player of RC Narbonne in the Pro D2 between 2006 until 2013, Regy scored 97 caps and 39 points. He also currently plays for Avenir Castanéen, known as Castanet RC in the Fédérale 1 since 2013.
