= Sylvain Chomlafel =

French footballer (born 1966)

Personal information
- Full name: Sylvain Chomlafel
- Date of birth: 15 March 1966 (age 60)
- Place of birth: Cezanne, France
- Height: 1.82 m (5 ft 11 1/2 in)
- Position: Striker

Senior career*
Years	Team	Apps	(Gls)
1981–1983	Sedan	26	(3)
1983–1990	Lens	15	(0)
1986–1987	→ Chamois Niortais (loan)	11	(1)
1988–1989	→ Angers (loan)	15	(2)
1990–1992	Épinal	34	(3)
- * Club domestic league appearances and goals

Sylvain Chomlafel (born 15 March 1966) is a French former professional footballer. He played as a forward.
