= Joseph Cassese House =

Historic house in Pennsylvania, United States

- U.S. National Register of Historic Places
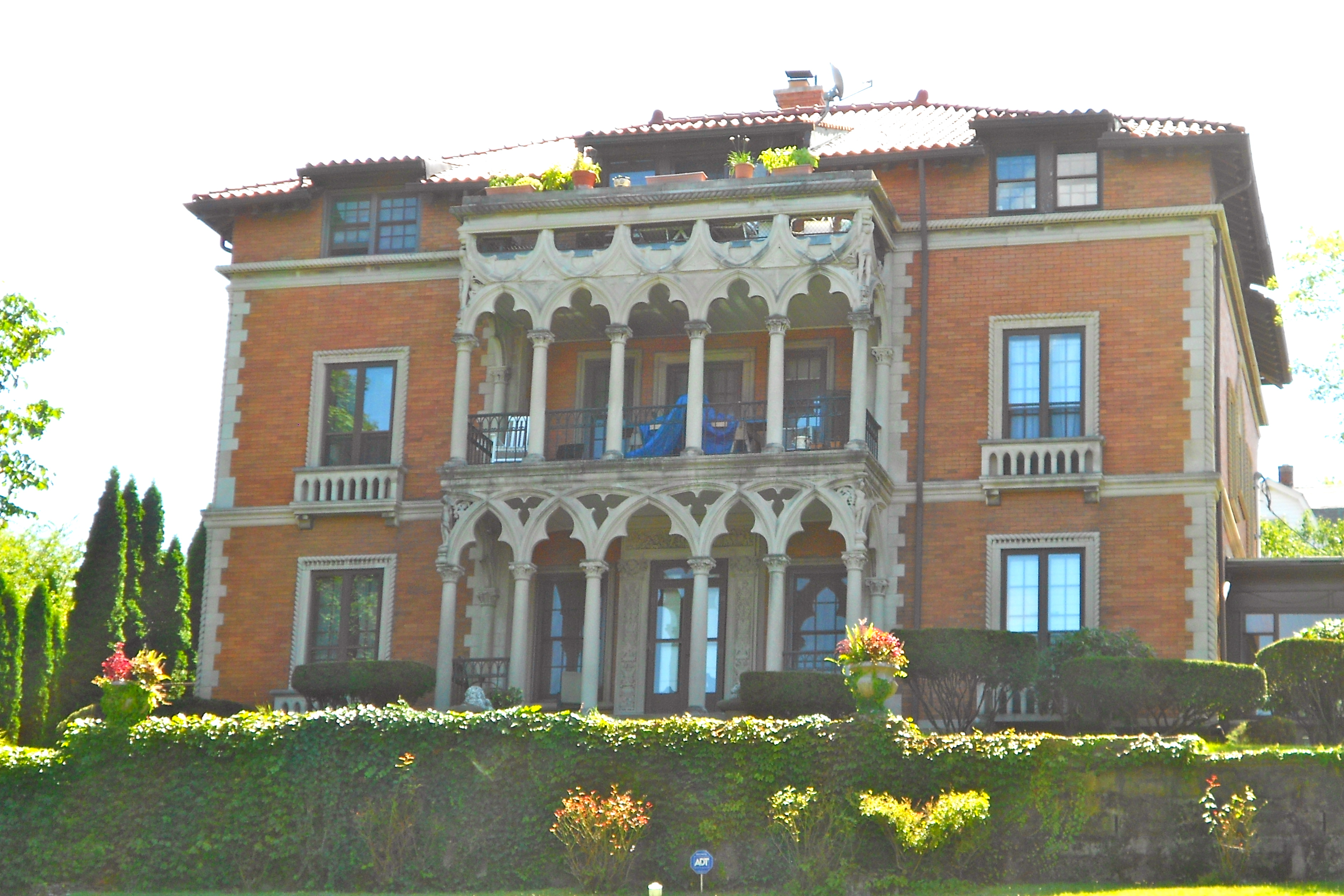
- in 2013

- Location within Pennsylvania Location within the United States
- Location: 1000 Clay Ave., Scranton, Pennsylvania
- Coordinates: 41°24′47″N 75°38′48″W
- Area: less than one acre
- Built: 1910
- Built by: Frank Carlucci
- Architect: Lewis Hancock Jr.
- Architectural style: Italian Renaissance
- MPS: Anthracite--Related Resources of Northeastern Pennsylvania MPS
- NRHP reference No.: 97001258
- Added to NRHP: October 24, 1997

The Joseph Cassese House is an historic home that is located in Scranton, Lackawanna County, Pennsylvania, United States.

It was added to the National Register of Historic Places in 1997.

== History and architectural features ==
Built circa 1910, this historic structure is a three-story, five-bay wide, frame dwelling with an ochre brick veneer. Designed in the Italian Renaissance Revival style, it has a low, hipped terra cotta tile roof. The front facade features an elaborately carved limestone porch. Also located on the property is a masonry garage with a hipped roof, and contributing retaining walls. The house was converted to apartments between 1926 and 1933.
