= Gillen Larrart =

- Born: Gillen Larrart; 10 May 1992 (age 34)
- Height: 1.85 m (6 ft 1 in)
- Weight: 90 kg (14 st 2 lb; 198 lb)

Rugby union career
- Position: Centre
Senior career
Years	Team	Apps	(Points)
2014-	Bayonne	2	(0)
- Correct as of 6 September 2014

Gillen Larrart is a French professional rugby union player. He plays at centre for Bayonne in the Top 14.
