= Paleo-inspiration =

Paradigm shift

Paleo-inspiration is a paradigm shift that leads scientists and designers to draw inspiration from ancient materials (from art, archaeology, natural history or paleo-environments) to develop new systems or processes, particularly with a view to sustainability.

Paleo-inspiration has already contributed to numerous applications in fields as varied as green chemistry, the development of new artist materials, composite materials, microelectronics, and construction materials.

== Semantics and definitions ==
While this type of application has been known for a long time, the concept itself was coined by teams from the French National Centre for Scientific Research, the Massachusetts Institute of Technology and the Bern University of Applied Sciences from the term Bioinspiration. They published the concept in a seminal paper published online in 2017 by the journal Angewandte Chemie.

Different names have been used to designate the corresponding systems, in particular: paleo-inspired, antiqua-inspired, antiquity-inspired or archaeomimetic. The use of these different names illustrates the extremely large time gap between the sources of inspiration, from millions of years ago when considering palaeontological systems and fossils, to much more recent archaeological or artistic material systems.

== Properties sought ==
Distinct physico-chemical and mechanical properties are sought.

They may concern intrinsic properties of the paleo-inspired materials:

- durability (materials found in certain contexts, having resisted alteration in these environments) and resistance to corrosion or alteration
- electronic or magnetic properties
- optical properties (especially from pigments or dyes, materials used for ceramic manufacture)

They can also concern processes:

- processes with low energy or resource consumption, with a view to chemical processes favouring sustainable development
- soft chemistry processes

== The paleo-inspired approach ==
This approach combines several key stages.

- Observation: This phase concerns materials, their properties, or the manufacturing processes (in relation in particular to the study of chaîne opératoire's in archaeology, or the history of techniques, in particular that of artistic techniques), and the processes of alteration (or even the work carried out in experimental taphonomy). This is therefore a first phase of reverse engineering. Some of these studies fall within the field of anthropology. As in the case of bioinspiration, this phase is fundamental and is based on an approach that favours creative exploration of objects, with few preconceived ideas (serendipity).
- Re-creation: A second phase follows aimed at simplifying materials, systems and processes in order to identify the fundamental mechanisms at the origin of the observed properties. This stage requires a back and forth between the synthesis of simplified systems and the characterisation of the new objects of study.
- Design: Finally, there follows a conception or design phase, concerning materials, systems or processes, and aiming at their concrete implementation for applications.

== Practical applications ==
=== Sustainable building materials ===
Emblematic examples include the microscopic study of the mineral phases present in Roman concrete to reproduce their durability in aggressive environments, particularly in the marine environment.

=== Durable colouring materials ===
A notable discovery is the elucidation of the atomic structure of Maya blue, a composite pigment combining a clay with an organic dye, which has led teams to produce pigments of other colours by combining clays with distinct organic dyes, such as "Maya violet".
