= Europe Gate =

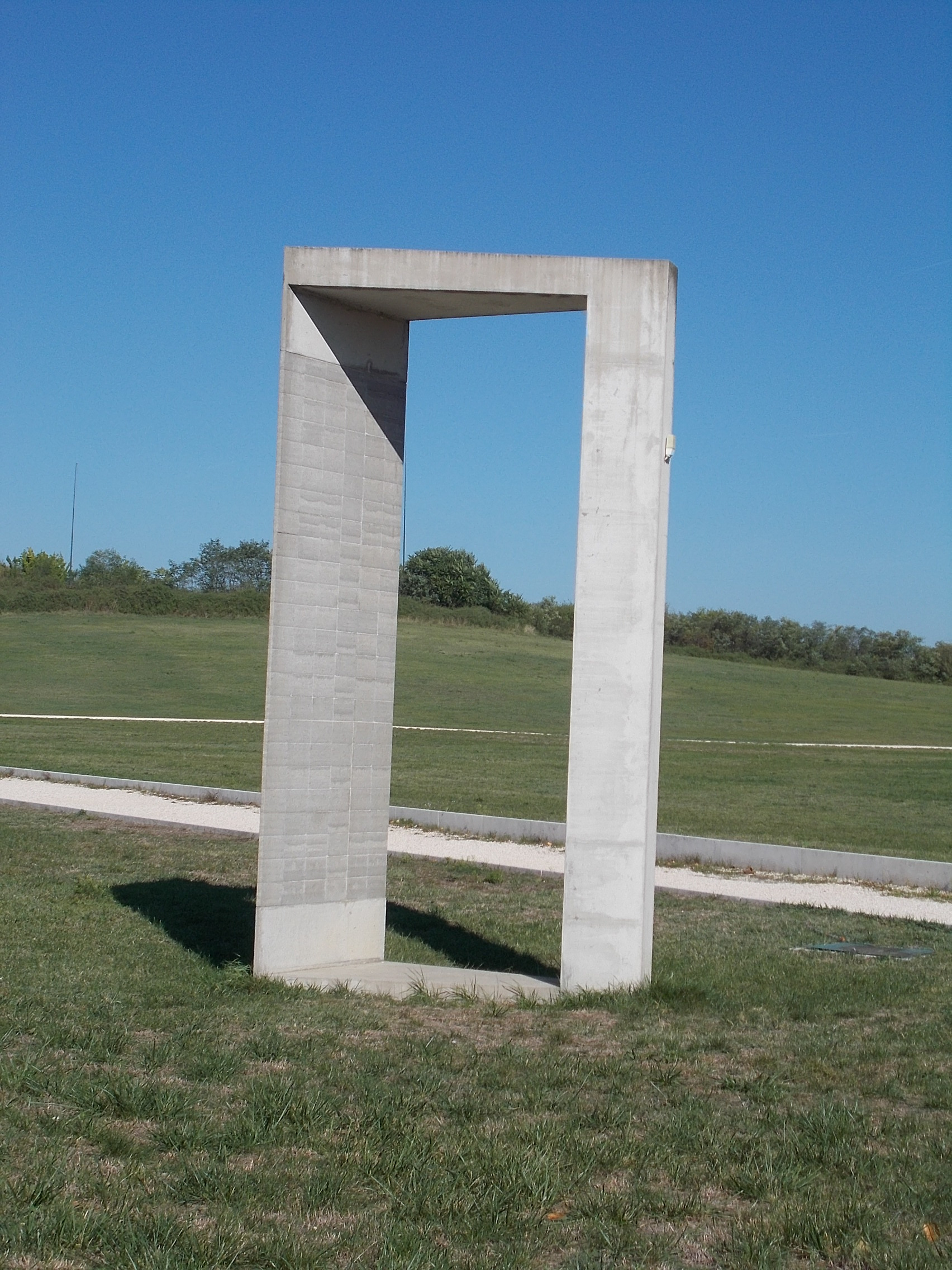
- Artist: Áron Losonczi and Orsolya Vadász
- Year: 2004
- Medium: LiTraCon
- Dimensions: 3.5 m × 3.5 m (140 in × 140 in)
- Location: Fort Monostor, Komárom, Hungary
- 47.74895°N 18.09917°E

The Europe Gate is a sculpture made out of LiTraCon, or Light Transmitting Concrete. It is a wall 3.5 meters squared and commemorates Hungary joining the European Union. It was built in 2004 in Fort Monostor in the town of Komárom by Áron Losonczi and Orsolya Vadász.
