= Avian sleep =

Sleep in birds

In birds, sleep consists of "periods of eye closure interrupted by short periods of eye-opening." During the short periods of eye-opening, electroencephalographic (EEG) studies indicate that the birds are still sleeping; the voltage level in the brain is identical. Birds restore their arousal thresholds during sleep. During their short eye-open periods, sleeping birds can mobilize almost instantaneously when threatened by a predator. Avian species have been found to rely on flock size and height for predatory precautions. Between the eye-opening and group sleep, these precautions allow sleep to be beneficial and safe.

The amount of sleep necessary to function can vary by species. Pectoral sandpipers migrate from the Southern Hemisphere to the Arctic Circle, their mating ground (where they breed during daylight). Since the sandpipers are polygamous, they mate (or search for a mate) for the duration of daylight. Males require less sleep during this period; some have been observed to give up 95 percent of their sleep time during the nineteen mating days. Most act similarly to humans when sleep-deprived, getting them into potentially life-threatening situations or slowing their migration speed.

== Comparative anatomy of avian brain and nervous system ==
The typical avian nervous system is similar to that of mammals. The central nervous system includes the brain and spinal cord, and a peripheral nervous system consists of nerves and sensory organs. Key attributes have evolved compared to other species, especially vision; avian visual capabilities are believed to be more advanced than any other group of vertebrates. In addition to larger eyes, birds have larger-than-average optic lobes. With a larger, more intricate optic lobe, some bird species can view the ultraviolet (UV) spectrum (beyond the visual range of the human eye). This UV visual capability facilitates hunting, as seen in nighthawks. UV-sensitive cone opsin is typically responsible for avian ability to see UV, but some species have circumvented this; owls can see UV light, but lack opsins. They compensate for this with essential enzymes which allow heightened rod sensitivity. UV is seen by several other animal groups, including cats and insects (where it has appeared to evolve in response to predator-prey relationships).

Trade-offs in anatomy and physiology are common, and this is seen in the olfactory lobes of most avian species. Possibly due to the larger-than-average optic lobes, avian olfactory lobes are relatively small; few bird species use smell to find food. Falcons and eagles do not tend to have larger cerebellums for flying. According to comparative neuroanatomy researcher Ludwig Edinger, avian brains consist mostly of basal ganglia (responsible for instinctive behavior, rather than behavioral plasticity). Scientists have challenged some of Edinger's findings, and called for the renaming of avian nervous-system organs to reflect their similarity to those of mammals.

== REM and slow-wave sleep ==
Avian sleep shares two similarities with that of mammals: rapid eye movement (REM) and slow-wave sleep (SWS). REM sleep is believed to have an important effect on motor functions and memory storage. EEGs show high-amplitude and low-frequency waves during REM sleep; SWS tends toward lower-amplitude, higher-frequency waves, and is believed to be a form of deep sleep. During SWS, membrane potentials in the neurons of the neocortex oscillate slowly.

A number of avian species exhibit unihemispheric slow-wave sleep: the ability to rest one half of the brain in SWS, while the other half appears to be awake. This type of sleep has also been seen in dolphins and whales. The organism is typically able to keep one eye open during this process, which allows added vigilance in high-predation environments. The evolution of this trait in birds and aquatic mammals is of interest to researchers because of the pressures involved. Unihemispheric SWS is thought to have evolved in aquatic mammals because they must return to the surface for oxygen; it is believed to help birds avoid predation, demonstrating homoplasy in the two groups.

== Dove experiment ==
In a study of how the Barbary dove's sleep patterns are affected by flock size, D. W. Lendrum intended to prove that larger flocks reduced overall vigilance, and the apparent increase in predation risk of a smaller flock would harm the doves' sleep cycle. At the beginning of the study, the doves were caged alone or in pairs of cages containing two, three or six. They were then placed in one of two environments. In the calm environment, Lendrum walked alone past the cage between 10 am and noon; in the aggressive environment, Lendrum walked past the cage with a domesticated ferret at the same time of day. Lendrum discovered that the birds in the calm environment spent substantially more time with their eyes closed than those in the aggressive environment.

Lendrum collected data on the doves' open- and closed-eye sleep; flocking was associated with an increase in a bird's overall eye-closure time and a decrease in its amount of eye-opening. In the presence of a predator, Lendrum found that the doves exhibited higher levels of individual vigilance and an increase in open-eye sleep; this reduced the active-sleep component of their total sleep time.

== Perch height ==
Predators are believed to play a large role in an organism's sleeping patterns. To adapt to predation, two common techniques have evolved: positioning oneself out of harm's way while sleeping, and sleeping more lightly (such as unihemispheric sleep). In birds, perch height is believed to play a significant role in sleep; lower perch height has been shown to reduce the number and length of REM sleep episodes in pigeons, and a higher perch increases REM sleep and decreases slow-wave sleep. Findings also suggest that the time spent awake by pigeons increases when nesting on lower perches. Lower perch height correlates with a higher risk of predation; REM sleep would place the pigeon in more danger, since it is a less reactive form of sleep.

== Light pollution ==
Light is one of the more common threats to sufficient sleep for birds living in anthropogenic environments, known as "artificial light pollution at night" (ALAN). ALAN eliminates darkness, a necessity for rest. Disrupting the birds' light and dark cycles can impact circadian rhythms, eventually harming sleep patterns. Biologist Thomas Raap conducted a study which suggested that exposure to ALAN affected the sleep behavior of Eurasian blue tits (Cyanistes caeruleus). In this study, birds woke up earlier due to ALAN factors such as seasonal timekeeping. Because light usually indicates a day's passage to birds, exposure to light pollution disrupts their ability to measure the length of a day. Outside densely populated areas, there is normally about a five-percent drop in sleep duration for blue-tit females during their nesting period. The researchers found a 50-percent reduction in the females' sleep duration during this period in urban centers, and suggested that the effects of ALAN were responsible.
