= Sébastien Morel =

France international rugby union player

Sébastien Morel (born 21 January 1981 in Vichy, Allier), is a French rugby union and sevens player who plays as a centre for La Rochelle (1.80 m, 88 kg).

== Career ==
- Until 2005: ASM Clermont
- Since 2005: Stade rochelais

== Honours ==
=== Club ===
- Finalist of the final phase of Pro D2: 2007

=== National team ===
- France team in rugby sevens
