= Cyril Cassese =

French footballer (born 1972)

Personal information
- Full name: Cyril Cassese
- Date of birth: December 10, 1972 (age 53)
- Place of birth: Toulon, France
- Height: 1.83 m (6 ft 0 in)
- Position: Striker

Senior career*
Years	Team	Apps	(Gls)
1988–1994	Toulon	31	(10)
1994–1995	Guingamp	4	(2)
1995–1997	Alès	31	(3)
1997–1998	Fréjus	33	(15)
1998–1999	Chamois Niortais	12	(1)
1999–2000	Istres	29	(10)
2000–2001	Reims	9	(0)
2001–2002	Toulon	0	(0)
- * Club domestic league appearances and goals

Cyril Cassese (born December 10, 1972) is a French former professional footballer who played as a striker.
