= David Chevallereau =

French footballer (born 1969)

Personal information
- Full name: David Chevallereau
- Date of birth: 10 April 1969 (age 57)
- Place of birth: Saintes, France
- Height: 1.79 m (5 ft 10 1/2 in)
- Position: Goalkeeper

Senior career*
Years	Team	Apps	(Gls)
1987–1990	Chamois Niortais	1	(0)
1990–1995	Luçon	?	(?)
1995–1998	La Roche-sur-Yon	31	(0)
2001–2002	L'Aiguillon	?	(?)
2002–2004	Luçon	?	(?)
- * Club domestic league appearances and goals

David Chevallereau (born 10 April 1969) is a French former professional footballer. He played as a goalkeeper and made one Ligue 2 appearance for Niort in 1990.
