= LiTraCon =

Translucent concrete building material

LiTraCon is a translucent concrete building material. The name is short for "light-transmitting concrete". The material is made of 96% concrete and 4% by weight of optical fibers. It was developed in 2001 by Hungarian architect Áron Losonczi working with scientists at the Technical University of Budapest.

LiTraCon is manufactured by the inventor's company, LiTraCon Bt, which was founded in spring 2004. The head office and workshop is near the town of Csongrád. As of 2006 all LiTraCon products have been produced by LiTraCon Bt. The concrete comes in precast blocks of different sizes.

The most notable installation of it to date is Europe Gate - a 4 m high sculpture made of LiTraCon blocks, erected in 2004 in observance of the entry of Hungary into the European Union. The product won the German "Red Dot 2005 Design Award" for 'highest design qualities'.

Though expensive, Litracon appeals to architects because it is stronger than glass and translucent, unlike concrete. It was considered as possible sheathing for New York's One World Trade Center.
