= Bioinspiration =

Development of novel concepts inspired by nature

Bioinspiration refers to the human development of novel materials, devices, structures, and behaviors inspired by solutions found in biological organisms, where they have evolved and been refined over millions of years. The goal is to improve modeling and simulation of the biological system to attain a better understanding of nature's critical structural features, such as a wing, for use in future bioinspired designs. Bioinspiration differs from biomimicry in that the latter aims to precisely replicate the designs of biological materials. Bioinspired research is a return to the classical origins of science: it is a field based on observing the remarkable functions that characterize living organisms and trying to abstract and imitate those functions.

== History ==
Ideas in science and technology often arise from studying nature. In the 16th and 17th century, G. Galilei, J. Kepler and I. Newton studied the motion of the sun and the planets and developed the first empirical equation to describe gravity. A few years later, M. Faraday and J. C. Maxwell derived the fundamentals of electromagnetism by examining interactions between electrical currents and magnets. The studies of heat transfer and mechanical work lead to the understanding of thermodynamics. However, quantum mechanics originated from the spectroscopic study of light. Current objects of attention have originated in chemistry but the most abundant of them are found in biology, e.g. the study of genetics, characteristics of cells and the development of higher animals and disease.

=== The current field of research ===
Bioinspiration is a solidly established strategy in the field of chemistry, but it is not a mainstream approach. Especially, this research is still developing its scientific and technological systems, on academic and industrial levels. In recent years, it is also considered to develop composites for aerospace and military applications.

This field dates back from the 1980s but in the 2010s, many natural phenomena have not been studied.

== Technical applications ==
There are many technical applications available nowadays that are bioinspired. However, this term should not be confused with biomimicry. For example, an airplane in general is inspired by birds. The wing tips of an airplane are biomimetic because their original function of minimizing turbulence and therefore needing less energy to fly, are not changed or improved compared to nature's original. Nano 3D printing methods are also one of the novel methods for bioinspiration. Plants and animals have particular properties which are often related to their composition of nano - and micro- surface structures. For example, research has been conducted to mimic the superhydrophobicity of Salvinia molesta leaves, the adhesiveness of gecko's toes on slippery surfaces, and moth antennas which inspire new approaches to detect chemical leaks, drugs and explosives.

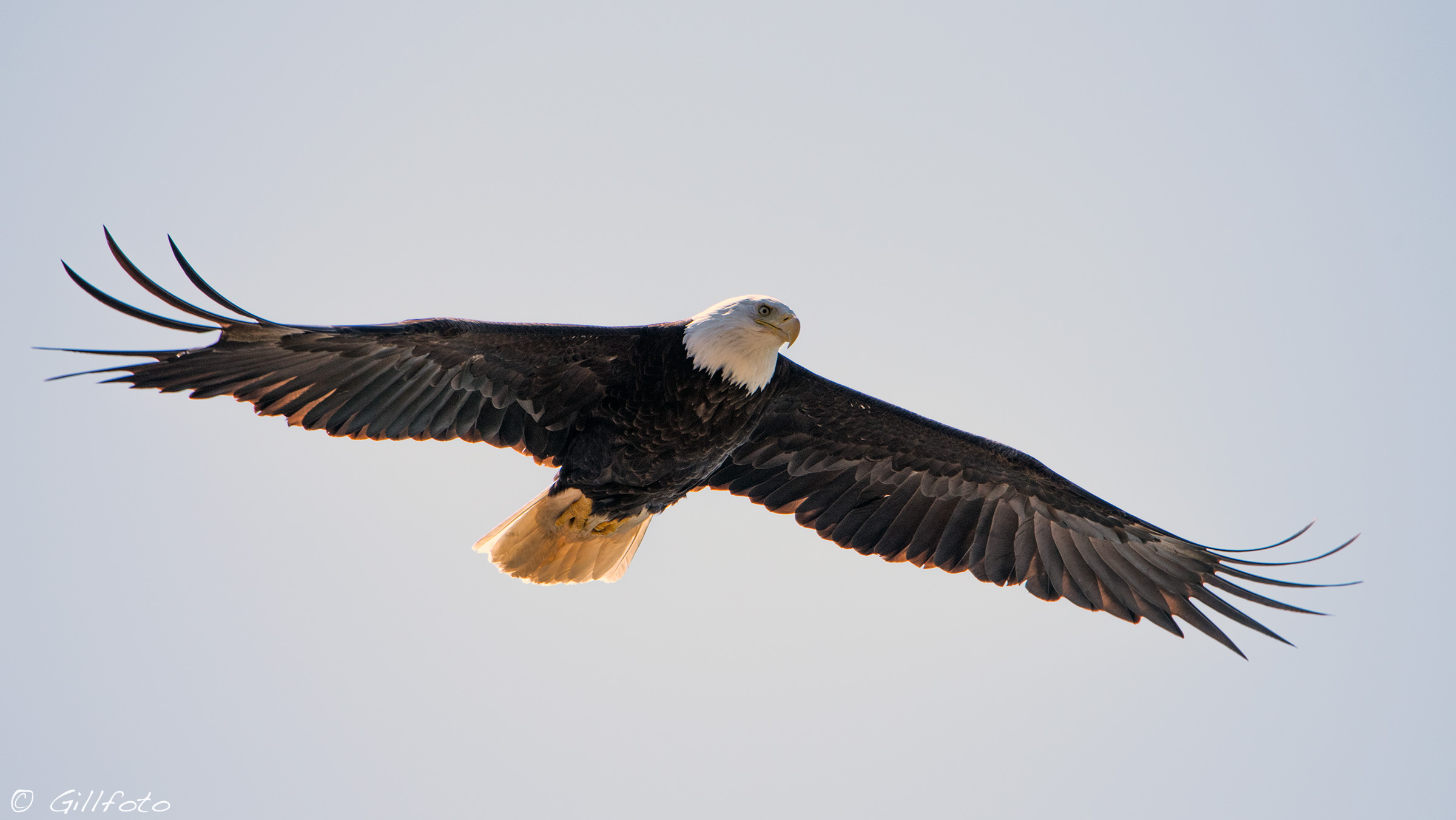
Wing tips of an eagle

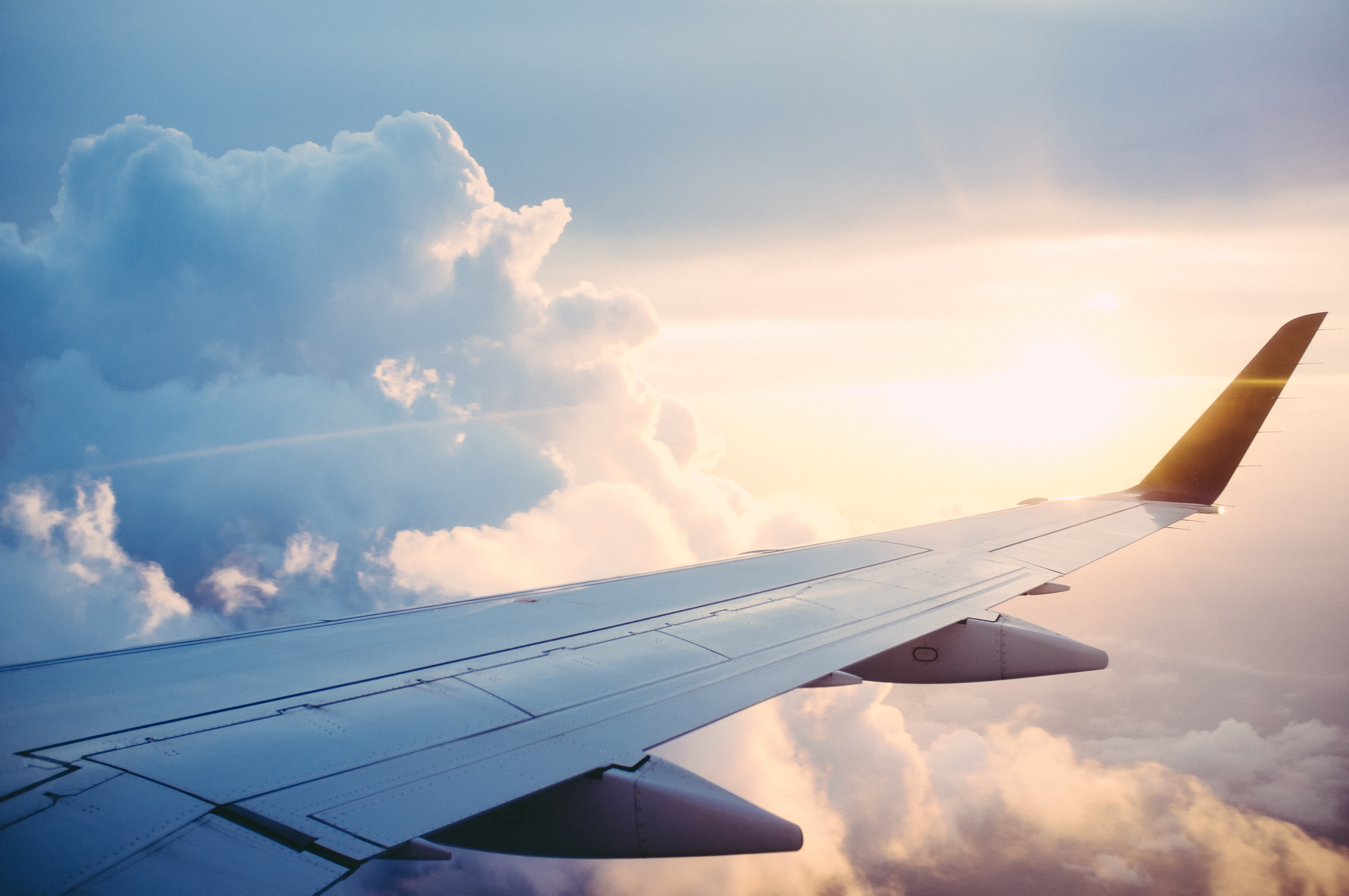
A wing tip of an airplane

== See also ==
- Bio-inspired computing
- Bio-inspired engineering
- Bio-inspired photonics
- Bio-inspired robotics
- Paleo-inspiration
