= List of emerging technologies =

New technologies actively in development

This is a list of emerging technologies, which are in-development technical innovations that have significant potential in their applications. The criteria for this list is that the technology must:

1. Exist in some way; purely hypothetical technologies cannot be considered emerging and should be covered in the list of hypothetical technologies instead. However, technologies being actively researched and prototyped are acceptable.
2. Have a Wikipedia article or adjacent citation covering them.
3. Not be widely used yet. Mainstream or extensively commercialized technologies can no longer be considered emerging.

Listing here is not a prediction that the technology will become widely adopted, only a recognition of significant potential to become widely adopted or highly useful if ongoing work continues, is successful, and the work is not overtaken by other technologies.

== Agriculture ==
Emerging technology	Status	Potential applications	Related articles
Agricultural robotics	Research and development, trial projects	Automation of agriculture	Agricultural drone
Agrivoltaics	Research, demonstration projects, and early commercial deployment	Dual use of agricultural land for solar photovoltaic generation, crop production, grazing, or pollinator habitat	Solar farm and Sustainable agriculture
Closed ecological systems	Research and development, working demonstrators (e.g. Biosphere 2)	Agriculture, scientific research, space colonization	Greenhouse, Eden Project, Bioshelter, Seawater greenhouse
Cultured meat	Research and development, trials	Humane, resource-efficient, healthier, and cheaper meat	New Harvest
Atmospheric water generator	Working prototype	Agriculture in semi-arid land	Desorption
Vertical farming	Research, development, experiments, and diffusion	Space-efficient farming and space travel applications	

== Construction ==
Emerging technology	Status	Potential applications	Related articles
Active structure	Research, development, commercialization	Adaptive structures that respond to different conditions, or supermassive buildings and infrastructure (e.g. space fountains)	
Arcology	Research, development, commercialization		
Domed city	Planned feature for Mall of the World	Weather-controlled city, colonization of other celestial bodies	
Earthscraper	Demonstration		
Smart environment	Research, development, commercialization	Automated, safer, energy efficient environments	Smart city, Building automation, Home automation, Fourth Industrial Revolution

== Economy ==
Emerging technology	Status	Potential applications	Related articles
Cryptocurrency	Diffusion	Payment, Digital currency	Bitcoin, Ethereum
Digital wallet	Diffusion	Payment, Digital currency	Google pay, Apple Pay
CBDC	Diffusion	Payment, Digital currency	Digital Rupee, Digital Euro

== Electronics, IT, and communications ==
Emerging technology	Status	Potential applications	Related articles
6G cellular communications	Conceptual	Mobile phones	
Artificial general intelligence	Hypothetical, experiments	Creating intelligent devices and robots; AI can counsel (or even take charge) in scientific projects, government, army, corporate governance, film and books creation, inventions etc.	Progress in artificial intelligence, technological singularity, applications of artificial intelligence
Biometrics	Diffusion, commercialization		
Blockchain	Diffusion, commercialization	Finance, digital currency, identity (social science), Web3.0, Smart contracts	Bitcoin, Ethereum
Carbon nanotube field-effect transistor	Research and development	Future miniaturization of transistors	
Cashierless store	Limited commercialization		
Civic technology	Research and development, projects	Smart cities, more responsive government	Smart city, e-democracy, open data, intelligent environment
Digital scent technology	Diffusion		Smell-O-Vision, iSmell
DNA digital data storage	Experiments	Mass data storage	
Electronic nose	Research, limited commercialization	Detecting spoiled food, chemical weapons, and cancer	
Emerging memory technologies (T-RAM, CBRAM, SONOS, RRAM, racetrack memory, NRAM, phase-change memory, FJG RAM, millipede memory, Skyrmion, programmable metallization cell, ferroelectric RAM, magnetoresistive RAM, nvSRAM)	In development		
Emerging magnetic data storage technologies (SMR, HAMR, BPM, MAMR, TDMR, CPP/GMR, PMR, hard disk drive)	In development (HAMR, BPM); diffusion (SMR)	Greatly improved storage density compared to current HDDs, can be combined	
5D optical data storage	Research, prototypes	Extremely compact, long-lasting information storage	
E-textiles	Research, diffusion	Wearable technology	
Exascale computing	Projects		
Exocortex	Diffusion of primitive amplifications; working prototypes of more; Hypothetical, experiments on more substantial amplification		
Flexible electronics	Research, development, prototypes, limited commercialization (e.g. Samsung Galaxy Fold)	Flexible and/or foldable electronic devices, and flexible solar cells which are lightweight, can be rolled up for launch, and are easily deployable	Nokia Morph, Flexible organic light-emitting diode
Fourth-generation optical discs (3D optical data storage, Holographic data storage)	Research, prototyping	Storing and archiving data previously erased for economic reasons	Blu-ray Disc, Optical storage
Li-Fi	Demos		Laser communication in space
Machine vision	Research, prototyping, commercialization	Biometrics, controlling processes (e.g., in driverless car, automated guided vehicle), detecting events (e.g., in visual surveillance), interaction (e.g., in human–computer interaction), robot vision	Computer vision, pattern recognition, digital image processing
Magnonics	Research	Data storage	
Memristor	Working prototype	Smaller, faster, more energy-efficient storage, analogue electronics, programmable logic, signal processing, neural networks, control systems, reconfigurable computing, brain–computer interfaces, RFID, and pattern recognition	
Metaverse	Experiments	Virtual reality, Augmented reality	
Molecular electronics	Research and development		
Multimodal contactless biometric face/iris systems	Deployed at various airports and federal security checkpoints	Unimodal facial recognition scanners	
Nanoelectromechanical systems	Research and development		
Nanoradio	Research and development, diffusion		
Neuromorphic engineering	Research and development		
Optical computing	Hypothetical, experiments; some components of integrated circuits have been developed	Smaller, faster, lower power consuming computing	
Quantum computing	Experiments, commercialization, early diffusion	Much faster computing for some kinds of problems, chemical modeling, new materials with programmed properties, Hypothetical of high-temperature superconductivity and superfluidity	
Quantum cryptography	Commercialization	Secure communications	
Quantum radar	Prototypes		
Radio-frequency identification	Diffusion of high cost	Smartstores – RFID-based self-checkout (keeping track of all incoming and outgoing products), food packaging, smart shelves, smart carts. See: potential uses	
Software-defined radio	Development, commercialization	Cognitive radio, Mesh networks, Software defined antenna	GNU Radio, List of software-defined radios, Universal Software Radio Peripheral
Solid-state transformer	Development, prototypes		
Speech recognition	Research, development, commercialization		
Spintronics	Working prototypes	Data storage, computing devices	
Subvocal recognition	Research, development, commercialization		
Thermal copper pillar bump	Working prototypes in discrete devices	Electric circuit cooling, micro-fluidic actuators, thermoelectric power generation	Ultra high definition holographic disc, Metal–insulator transition
Three-dimensional integrated circuit	Development, commercialization	Memory and data processing	
Twistronics	Development		

== Entertainment ==
Emerging technology	Status	Potential applications	Related articles
4D Film	Commercialization	Films	
Cloud gaming	Commercialization	Handheld game consoles, Mobile gaming, Real-time ray-tracing	Google Stadia, GeForce Now
Immersive virtual reality	Hypothetical, limited commercialization	An artificial environment where the user feels just as immersed as they usually feel in conscious reality.	Virtusphere, 3rd Space Vest, haptic suit, immersive technology, simulated reality, holodeck (fictional)
Synthetic media	Research and development	Films, photos	Deepfake, StyleGAN, DeepDream, DALL-E, Stable Diffusion, Sora

== Optoelectronics ==
Emerging technology	Status	Potential applications	Related articles
Laser video display	Limited commercialization (e.g. Mitsubishi LaserVue TV in 2008)	Displays with a very wide colour gamut	Laser TV, Comparison of display technology
Holography (holographic display, computer-generated holography)	Diffusion		
Optical transistor	Some prototypes		
Screenless display (Virtual retinal display, Bionic contact lens, Augmented reality, Virtual reality)	Experiments	Virtual tools and entertainment in a real-world environment, aids for the visually impaired	Head-mounted display, Head-up display, Adaptive optics, EyeTap, Google Glass, Microsoft HoloLens, AR cloud
Volumetric (3D) display	Research, working prototypes, commercialization	Television, computer interfaces, cinemas, 3-dimensional imagery	Autostereoscopic display, stereoscopic display, volumetric display, Holographic display, Light Field display, Nintendo 3DS, Swept-volume display

== Energy ==
Emerging technology	Status	Potential applications	Related articles
Airborne wind turbine	Research	Wind power generation at higher altitudes, increasing efficiency	KiteGen
Atomic battery	Niche uses	Reliable power for years and decades without external sources or refueling, in spacecraft, implantable medical devices, or remote areas	Radioisotope thermoelectric generator, Betavoltaic device
Americium battery	Estimated working prototype in 5–10 years from 2019	Energy storage	
Artificial photosynthesis	Research, experiments, growing interest in a macroscience global project	Photosynthesis-like energy and oxygen production from artificial structures	Sustainocene, Renewable energy, Nanotechnology
Concentrated solar power	Growing markets in California, Spain, Northern Africa	Electricity generation	DESERTEC, BrightSource Energy, Solar Millennium
Double-layer capacitor	Diffusion, continued development	Faster-charging, longer-lasting, more flexible, greener energy storage (e.g. for regenerative braking)	
Energy harvesting	Experiments	Constant energy source for mobile, wearable and ubiquitous devices	Humavox
Flywheel energy storage	Limited commercialization	Energy storage	
Fusion power	Research, experiments	Electricity and heat generation, fusion torch recycling with waste heat	ITER, NIF, Wendelstein 7-X, Magnetic confinement fusion, Dense plasma focus, Muon-catalyzed fusion
Generation IV nuclear reactor	Research, experiments	Electricity and heat generation, transmutation of nuclear waste stockpiles from traditional reactors	
Gravity battery	Small-scale examples	Energy storage	
Home fuel cell	Research, commercialization	Off-the-grid, producing electricity in using an environmentally friendly fuel as a backup during long term power failures.	Autonomous building, Bloom Energy Server
Lithium–air battery	Research, experiments	Laptops, mobile phones, long-range electric cars; storing energy for electric grid	
Lithium iron phosphate battery	Commercialization	Energy storage	
Lithium–sulfur battery	Research and development	Energy storage	
Magnesium battery	Early commercialization	Energy storage	
Molten salt reactor	Research, experiments	Electricity and heat generation	
Nanowire battery	Experiments, prototypes	Laptops, mobile phones, long-range electric cars; storing energy for electric grid	
Nantenna	Research	Electricity generation	
Ocean thermal energy conversion	Prototype	Electricity generation	
Solid-state battery	Niche uses	Reliable, power-dense energy storage (particularly for electric cars and wearable technology)	
Smart grid	Research, diffusion	Advanced grid power management	Smart meter, SuperSmart Grid
Space-based solar power	Early research	Electricity generation	
Thorium nuclear fuel cycle	Research started in the 1954, still ongoing	Electricity and heat generation	
Vortex engine		Power generation	
Wireless energy transfer	Prototypes, diffusion, short range consumer products	Wirelessly powered equipment: laptop, cell phones, electric cars, etc.	WiTricity, resonant inductive coupling
Zero-energy building	Expansion	Energy-efficient homes	Passive house

== Materials and textiles ==
Emerging technology	Status	Potential applications	Related articles
4D printing	Research and development		
Aerogel	Hypothetical, experiments, diffusion, early uses	Improved thermal insulation (for pipelines, aerospace, etc.), as well as insulative "glass" if it can be made clear	
Amorphous metal	Experiments, use in amorphous metal transformers	Armor, implants	
Bioplastic	Limited commercialization (e.g. polylactic acid in 3D printing)	Disposable packaging and single-use items	
Conductive polymers	Research, experiments, prototypes	Lighter and cheaper wires, antistatic materials, organic solar cells	Jacquard weaving
Cryogenic treatment	Research, experiments, prototypes	Significantly stronger metal components	
Edible packaging	Diffusion	Biodegradable alternatives to plastic	
Electric armour	Prototypes	Better protection for warships and armoured fighting vehicles from shaped charge weapons	
Fullerene	Experiments, diffusion	Programmable matter	
Graphene	Hypothetical, experiments, diffusion, early uses	Higher-specific strength structural components, higher-frequency transistors, lower-cost mobile displays, automotive hydrogen storage, biosensors, more efficient batteries	
Lab-on-a-chip	Limited commercialization	More efficient laboratory analysis	
High-temperature superconductivity	Cryogenic receiver front-end (CRFE) RF and microwave filter systems for mobile phone base stations; prototypes in dry ice; experiments for lower temperatures	No-loss conductors, frictionless bearings, magnetic levitation, lossless high-capacity accumulators, electric cars, heat-free integrated circuits	
Magnetic nanoparticles	Development	Cancer treatment, wastewater treatment	
Magnetorheological fluid	Research and development, limited magnetorheological damping applications	Seismic damping for earthquake resistance	Electrorheological fluid
Microfluidics	Research and development		
High-temperature superfluidity	Superfluid gyroscopes exist but work at very low temperatures	High-precision measure of gravity, navigation and maneuver devices, possible devices to emit gravitomagnetic field, frictionless mechanical devices	
Metamaterials	Hypothetical, experiments, diffusion	Microscopes, cameras, metamaterial cloaking, cloaking devices	
Metal foam	Research, limited commercialization	Space colonies, floating cities	
Multi-function structures	Hypothetical, experiments, some prototypes, few commercial	Wide range of applications (e.g. self-health monitoring, self-healing materials)	
Nanomaterials: carbon nanotubes	Hypothetical, experiments, diffusion, early uses	Higher-specific strength structural components	Potential applications of carbon nanotubes, Carbon-fiber-reinforced polymers
Quantum dot	Research, experiments, prototypes, commercialization	Quantum dot lasers, quantum dot displays, faster data communication, laser scalpels	
Self-healing materials	Research, experiments	Infrastructure, robotics, biotech	
Silicene	Early research	Nanoscale electronics	
Superalloy	Research, diffusion	Significantly stronger metal components (particularly in aircraft jet engines)	
Synthetic diamond	Research, commercialization	Electronics	
Time crystal	Research experiments	Quantum computers with stable qubits	
Translucent concrete	Commercialization	Construction of buildings and sculptures (e.g. Europe Gate)	

== Medicine ==
Emerging technology	Status	Potential applications	Related articles
Artificial uterus	Research, experiments	Space travel, extracorporeal pregnancy, reprogenetics, same-sex procreation	
Body implant, prosthesis	Trials, from animal (e.g., brain implants) to human clinical (e.g., insulin pump implant), to commercial production (e.g. pacemaker, joint replacement, cochlear implant)	Brain implant, retinal implant	Prosthetics, prosthetics in fiction, cyborg
Cryonics	Hypothetical, research, commercialization (e.g. Alcor, Cryonics Institute)	Life extension	
De-extinction	Research, development, trials	Animal husbandry, pets, zoos	Revival of the woolly mammoth
Electronic medical records	Deployment	Replacing paper medical records	
Human DNA vaccination and mRNA vaccination	Implementation in 2021 to combat the COVID-19 pandemic	Disease vaccinations, cancer therapy	
Enzybiotics	Successful first trials		
Genetic engineering of organisms and viruses	Research, development, commercialization	Creating and modifying species (mainly improving their physical and mental capabilities), bio-machines, eliminating genetic disorders (gene therapy), new materials production, healthier and cheaper food, creating drugs and vaccines, research in natural sciences, bioremediation, detecting arsenic, CO2 reducing superplant,	Biopunk, Genetically modified food, superhuman, human enhancement, transhumanism, gene doping, designer baby, genetic pollution
Hibernation or suspended animation	Research, development, animal trials	Organ transplantation, space travel, prolonged surgery, emergency care	
Life extension, strategies for engineered negligible senescence	Research, experiments, animal testing	Increased life spans	Immortality, biological immortality
Nanomedicine	Research, experiments, limited use		
Nanosensors	Research and development		
Omni Processor	Research and development; some prototypes		
Oncolytic virus	Human trials (Talimogene laherparepvec, reolysin, JX-594), commercialisation (H101)	Cancer therapy, imaging	Oncolytic virus
Personalized medicine, full genome sequencing	Research, experiments	Personalized medical procedures, genome sequencing during drug trials	Personal genomics
Phage therapy	First trial uses		
Plantibody	Clinical trials		
Regenerative medicine	Some laboratory trials	Life extension	
Robotic surgery	Research, diffusion		
Senolytic	Under investigation		
Stem cell treatments	Research, experiments, phase I human trial spinal cord injury treatment (GERON), cultured cornea transplants	Treatment for a wide range of diseases and injuries	Stem cell, stem cell treatments
Synthetic biology, synthetic genomics	Research, development, first synthetic bacteria created May 2010	Infinitely scalable production processes based on programmable species of bacteria and other life forms	BioBrick, iGEM, synthetic genomics
Tissue engineering	Research, diffusion	Organ printing, tooth regeneration	
Tricorder	Research and development	Diagnosing medical conditions	Medical tricorder
Virotherapy	Research, human trials	Gene therapy, cancer therapy	Virotherapy, Oncolytic Virus
Vitrification or cryoprotectant	Research, some experiments	Organ transplantation, cryonics	

== Neuroscience ==
Emerging technology	Status	Potential applications	Related articles
Artificial brain	Research	Treatment of neurological disease, artificial intelligence	Blue Brain Project, Human Brain Project
Brain–computer interface	Research and commercialization	Faster communication and learning, as well as more "real" entertainment (generation of feelings and information in brain on-demand) and the control of emotions in the mentally ill	Experience machine, Neuralink, Stent-electrode recording array
Brain-reading, neuroinformatics	Research		
Electroencephalography	Research, diffusion	Controlling electronic devices via brain waves	BrainGate
Head transplant	Success in animal experiments, including 2-headed result	Treatment of debilitating diseases or severe disfigurement	Brain transplant, hand transplantation, organ transplantation
Memory erasure	Hypothetical, research	Treatment of post-traumatic stress disorder	
Neuroprosthetics	Research, animal trials	Visual prosthesis, brain implant, exocortex, retinal implant, neurograin	
Wetware computer	Experimentation	Artificial Intelligence, better understanding of neurons	

== Military ==
Emerging technology	Status	Potential applications	Related articles
Caseless ammunition	Field tests and limited commercialization	Lighter and cheaper ammunition; the lack of a case may also simplify the design of firearms	Lightweight Small Arms Technologies
Cloaking device	Successful experiments cloaking small objects under some conditions	Stealth	Metamaterial cloaking
Directed-energy weapon	Research, development, some prototypes		Laser Weapon System, Iron Beam
Electrolaser	Research and development		
Electrothermal-chemical technology	Research and development	Tank, artillery, and close-in weapon systems	
Force field	Hypothetical, experiments	Military and law enforcement, space travel	Plasma window
Green bullet	Development	Environment-friendly ammunition	
Hypersonic cruise missile	Development		Avangard, Kinzhal, Zircon, BrahMos-II, Prompt Global Strike, DARPA Falcon Project, DF-ZF, Boeing X-51 Waverider
Laser weapon	Research and development, trials	Tracking and destruction of rockets, bombs, drones etc.	Advanced Tactical Laser, High Energy Liquid Laser Area Defense System
MAHEM	Research and development	A formed penetrator using molten metal in place of self-forging explosives	Explosively pumped flux compression generator
Precision-guided firearm	Research and development	Increased accuracy by marksmen	EXACTO, Smart bullet, TrackingPoint, SMASH Handheld
Railgun	Research and development	Cheaper and safer ammunition	Coilgun
Stealth technology	Research, development, commercialization	Electronic countermeasures	Plasma stealth, Stealth aircraft, Radar-absorbent material
Telescoped ammunition	Research and development	More compact cartridges	
Lightweight Small Arms Technologies	Research and development		

== Space ==
Emerging technology	Status	Potential applications	Related articles
Artificial gravity	Research and development	Space travel	Spin gravity
Asteroid mining	Conceptual; NASA has announced plans to capture and redirect an asteroid	Commerce, resource supply	
Propellantless propulsion	Varies by subtype; some in production/spaceflight status; some theoretical.	Reduction of propellant requirements; orbital maneuvering; long-duration interplanetary and interstellar missions	Electrodynamic tether, Electrodeless plasma thruster, Laser propulsion
Inflatable space habitat	Development, prototypes built and tested	Space habitats	Bigelow Aerospace
Reusable launch vehicle	Commercial	Circumvention of the cost of expendable launch vehicles outside of national government or military missions	Reusable launch vehicle
Starshot	Research	Uncrewed interstellar probes	
Stasis chamber	Research and development, experiments	Interplanetary space travel, interstellar space travel, medical	

== Robotics ==
Emerging technology	Status	Potential applications	Related articles
Android, gynoid	Research, development, prototypes, diffusion, commercializing	Disabled, infant and older people care, housekeeping, sex-worker, flight-attendant, model, hostess, waiter, security guard	Tesla bot, Atlas, Figure AI
Gastrobot	Prototypes	Robots fuelled by digesting organic matter	
Molecular nanotechnology, nanorobotics	Hypothetical, experiments	Machines that can make anything given the materials, cheap planetary terraforming	Molecular assembler, Santa Claus machine, Nanotechnology
Powered exoskeleton	Research, development, prototypes, diffusion, commercializing	Heavy lifting, paralysis, muscle-related diseases, warfare, construction, firefighting, care for the elderly and disabled	LOPES (exoskeleton), ReWalk, Human Universal Load Carrier, fictional armor Iron Man's armor, Future Force Warrior
Self-reconfiguring modular robot	Hypothetical, experiments, early prototypes	As a universal physical machine, SRCMR may change the way many physical structures and machines are made	Robot, swarm robotics, autonomous research robot
Swarm robotics	Hypothetical, experiments	Autonomous construction, space construction	Swarm intelligence, autonomous robotics, nanorobotics, particle swarm optimization, multi-agent systems, behavior-based robotics
Uncrewed vehicle	Research and development, diffusion, commercial	Transport of goods, surveillance, oceanography, wildfire mapping, pipeline security, home security, anti-piracy, border control, pursuing criminals, oil, gas and mineral exploration and production, geophysical and geomagnetic surveys, exploration of hazardous areas, firefighting, military and peacekeeping operations, search and rescue, bomb disposal, police raids	Unmanned aerial vehicle, AeroVironment, AeroVironment Global Observer, AeroVironment Nano Hummingbird, Unmanned combat air vehicle, Unmanned ground vehicle, Unmanned space vehicle, Unmanned surface vehicle, Unmanned underwater vehicle, Autonomous underwater vehicle

== Transport ==
Emerging technology	Status	Potential applications	Related articles
Airless tire	Research, development, early prototypes	Safer tires	Tweel
Atmospheric satellite	Experimentation	More widespread communications	
Autonomous Rail Rapid Transit	Commercialization, diffusion	Reducing air pollution, decreasing oil consumption	Electric vehicle
Flexible wings (X-53 Active Aeroelastic Wing, Adaptive Compliant Wing), fluidic flight controls	Experiments, prototypes	Controlling aircraft, ships	Aircraft flight control system, BAE Systems Demon, fluidics
Distributed propulsion	Prototypes	More efficient air travel	
eVTOL	Research, Development	Low emission and low noise air travel, air taxis	
Flying car	Early commercialization, prototypes	More effective transportation	Terrafugia Transition, Moller M400 Skycar, Urban Aeronautics X-Hawk, AeroMobil
Fusion rocket	Research, development	Fast interplanetary travel, with limited interstellar travel applications	
Ground-level power supply	Standardization, commercialization	Reduction of required battery size and weight for battery electric vehicles by charging while driving	Trafikverkets Program för Elvägar; Transport in France § Electric roads
Hoverbike	Working prototypes, early commercialization	Package delivery, search and rescue	
Hovertrain, Ground effect train, Ground effect vehicle	Research, development	Faster trains	Aérotrain, Duke Hospital PRT, Hovercraft
Hybrid airship	Prototypes	Air travel with low fuel consumption	Airlander 10
Ion-propelled aircraft	Research, development, prototypes	Better flying transportation, efficient propulsion in air	Electrohydrodynamics
Jet pack or backpack helicopter	Early commercialization, prototypes	More effective individual transportation	
Maglev train	Research, early commercialization, diffusion	Faster trains	Transrapid, Shanghai Maglev Train, Linimo, L0 Series
Magnetic levitation	Research, development, Commercialization (Maglev Train)	High temperature superconductivity, cryogenics, low temperature refrigerators, superconducting magnet design and construction, fiber reinforced plastics for vehicles and structural concretes, communication and high power solid-state controls, vehicle design (aerodynamics and noise mitigation), precision manufacturing, construction and fabrication of concrete structures, maglev car, maglev based spacecraft launch	Vactrain, Levicar
Magnetohydrodynamic drive	Research, development, prototypes	Marine Propulsion, Aircraft Propulsion, Spacecraft Propulsion	Yamato 1
Mass driver	Prototypes		
Orbital propellant depot	Research, development	Deep-space missions with larger payloads, satellite life extension, lowering cost per kg launched to space	
Personal rapid transit	Early commercialization, diffusion	More effective transportation	Morgantown PRT, ULTra
Physical Internet	Research		
Scooter-sharing system	Commercialization	Increased density	Bird (company)
Vactrain	Research, development	High-speed transportation	ET3 Global Alliance, Hyperloop
Plasma propulsion	Research and development	Spacecraft propulsion	
Pulse detonation engine	Research and development; one prototype flown in 2008	Higher-efficiency propulsion	
Quiet Supersonic Technology	Prototype	Supersonic air travel over land	
Self-driving car	Research, development, early commercialization	Reducing concerns of tiredness while driving and also looking outside in the car. Helpful in countries where employment of personal drivers is expensive.	Waymo, Tesla FSD
Space elevator	Research	Non-rocket spacelaunch	Orbital ring, Sky hook, Space fountain
Spaceplane	Research, development	Hypersonic transport	A2, Skylon
Vehicular communication systems	Research and development, some diffusion	Traffic management, automatic accommodation of emergency vehicles, driver assistance systems, automated highways	Artificial Passenger, Dedicated short-range communications, Intelligent transportation system

== See also ==
General:
- Anthropogenics
- Differential technological development
- Diffusion of innovations
- Disruptive innovation
- Ecological modernization
- Environmental technology
- Frugal innovation
- Green development
- Industrial ecology
- List of existing technologies predicted in science fiction
- List of hypothetical technologies
- List of inventions
- List of inventors
- Sustainable development
- Technology readiness level

Ethics:

- Bioethics
- Casuistry
- Computer ethics
- Engineering ethics
- Nanoethics
- Neuroethics
