= Jason Schauble =

American businessman and U.S. military combat veteran

Jason Schauble (born April 10, 1975) is an American businessman and U.S. military combat veteran. As an infantry officer in the United States Marine Corps, Schauble led actions during the Iraq War that earned him the Silver Star, the Bronze Star with combat distinguishing device, and the Purple Heart.

Since medically retiring from the Marines in 2006, Schauble has served in various civilian roles with the Marine Special Operations Command (MARSOC) and with firearms manufacturers. He was Chief Executive Officer of TrackingPoint, an applied technology company that created and sells precision guided firearm and smart rifle technology. He was the Chief Revenue Officer and President at Silencerco. He was a partner at Guinn Partners, a technology consulting group in Austin, TX.

== Early life and education ==
Schauble was born in Norwood, Massachusetts. After high school in Canton, Massachusetts, a portion of which he attended in Germany as an exchange student, he attended Bates College where he earned his Bachelor of Arts degree in 1997.

During his military career, Schauble attended the US. Marine Corps Reconnaissance School, U.S. Army Ranger School, U.S. Army Airborne School, and U.S. Navy Survival, Evasion, Resistance and Escape (SERE) School, among others.

== Military career ==
=== Service ===
After graduating from college, Schauble enlisted in the Marine Corps. He was eventually promoted to captain and a commander of a Force Reconnaissance unit. As part of Operation Iraqi Freedom, Captain Schauble and his platoon were deployed to Iraq in 2004.

=== Heroism ===
For his actions during the pre-assault shaping and seizure of the cities of Hit and Fallujah from October 11 to November 16, 2004, Schauble was awarded the Bronze Star with combat distinguishing device. The citation recognized Schauble for coordinating all artillery fire, as well as sniper operations. It also commended him for bravery and selfless behavior in exposing himself to enemy fire, including a machine gun, to direct and lead his Marines.

On the night of January 3, 2005, Schauble and his unit were ordered to attack a farmhouse in Faris Town, south of Fallujah, where reconnaissance had shown roughly a dozen insurgents inside. As they approached the house, two insurgents exited and a firefight began. Two Marines made their way into the house and one was killed.

With no regard for his personal safety, Schauble threw a flashbang and entered the darkened, second room. Moving to the far wall, he engaged multiple insurgents and attempted to recover the dead Marine. Taking fire from enemies six feet away, Schauble pushed on, killing two insurgents before being shot in the arm and chest. He continued to fight, drawing enemy fire so his Marines could enter and kill five more insurgents.

Due to severe nerve damage to his right arm caused during the fight, Schauble was sent to Camp Lejeune, North Carolina, to recover from his injuries. While at Camp Lejeune and before his medical retirement from military service, Schauble used his expertise to help design and build the Foreign Military Training Unit (FMTU) and then Marine Special Operations Command (MARSOC) in 2005 and 2006.

On July 28, 2006, in a ceremony at Camp Lejeune, North Carolina, Schauble was awarded the Silver Star for his heroism under fire in Fallujah. For his outstanding service as the Future Operations Officer at the FMTU, he was also awarded the Meritorious Service Medal.

== Post-Military Career ==
=== Civilian Service ===
After his retirement from the Marines in December 2006, Schauble transitioned to service as a colonel equivalent DoD civilian and served as Deputy G-3 for Operations at MARSOC headquarters at Camp Lejeune, where he was responsible for planning and prioritizing actions to man, train, equip, and provide special operations capability to U.S. Special Operations Command.

=== Business career ===
In February 2008, Schauble left his position at MARSOC as it reached full operational capability of 2,500 Marines to join Remington Arms Company as director of project management. After being promoted to vice president and selected to lead Remington Defense in February 2009, Remington competed for, and was awarded, a number of high-profile government contracts including a contract to upgrade the M24 sniper rifle, also known as the XM2010 program, for the U.S. Army; contracts with special forces for shotguns and sniper rifles; and in early 2013, a contract to provide sniper rifles to U.S. Special Operations Command.

Schauble also championed the acquisition of, and subsequently led, Advanced Armament Corporation, the market leader in silencer, flash hider, and muzzle brake technology. Under Schauble's tenure, Advanced Armament Corporation grew its business and was also awarded a number of government contracts including a U.S. Special Operations Command award for the Family of Muzzle Brakes and Silencers program. At the same time, Schauble was directly responsible for the firing of Kevin Brittingham, AAC's founder and previous owner. This action resulted in Remington losing a $14 Million (USD) case for wrongful dismissal.

Schauble left Remington in January 2012 and joined TrackingPoint LLC in March, 2012 as its President. He was promoted to Chief Executive Officer on May 15, 2013, succeeding TrackingPoint's founder, John McHale, who became chairman of the board. Schauble was then fired from TrackingPoint in November 2013. In January 2014, Jason was hired as the chief revenue officer of Utah suppressor manufacturer Silencerco. He was named president in March 2017 and left SilencerCo in November 2017. He was a partner at Guinn Partners, a technology consulting group in Austin, Texas.
