= FJG =

FJG may refer to:

- Fatehjang railway station, in Pakistan
- Federal jobs guarantee
- FJG RAM, a type of computer memory
- Fonda, Johnstown and Gloversville Railroad, a defunct American railway
