= Smart Pistol =

Fictional firearm

- The Smart Pistol MK5 as seen in Titanfall
- Publisher: Electronic Arts
- First appearance: Titanfall
- Created by: Respawn Entertainment
- Genre: First-person shooter

In-universe information
- Type: Smart gun firearm

The Smart Pistol is a fictional pistol used in the Titanfall series of first-person shooter video games. Created for pilots of the game's mechs, known as Titans, it is used to fight adversaries when the pilot is outside of the mech. The Smart Pistol MK5 appears in the first Titanfall, while the Smart Pistol MK6 appears in Titanfall 2. Known as a "controversial", notorious and divisive weapon due to its ability to automatically target and fire at multiple enemies at once, its power was lowered in the sequel, where it was made a temporary weapon. The Smart Pistol was both criticized for how strong its targeting ability was, and praised for its uniqueness and how it lowered the barrier to entry for players who were new to the genre or normally performed poorly in shooters.

== Characteristics ==
In Titanfall, the Smart Pistol, despite being a handgun, consumes the player's primary weapon slot, for balance reasons. The gun locks onto targets automatically when aimed, requiring "little in the way of careful aiming". It targets and fires much more slowly than other weapons, such as the assault rifle.

In Titanfall 2, the Smart Pistol MK6 was changed from a primary weapon into a limited boost item the player had to work for in order, after "a lot of negative feedback" from fans that it was too strong. It plays a role in one of the later missions in Titanfall 2's campaign, being used to mow down hordes of enemies while depicted as a superweapon - likely acknowledgment of this feedback.

== Development ==
According to Titanfall's game director, Steve Fukuda, the Smart Pistol "was born of a complaint from Respawn co-founder Jason West, who complained of 'no shooters for old men.'" Saying that West had expressed frustration at being unable to sneak up on enemies without dying, the studio added the Smart Pistol as "a little bit of a bridge weapon for newcomers to the game". It was also intended to help the player "make short work of AI-controlled grunts and spectres".

While the Smart Pistol did not initially appear in the battle royale spin-off to Titanfall, Apex Legends, a modder discovered textures and materials for the Smart Pistol MK6 in the game's files, leading to speculation that it could be added to the game. A modified Smart Pistol was later added as part of the "Whistler" tactical ability for the character Ballistic, allowing him to debuff enemies.

== Reception and legacy ==
"The Smart Pistol makes Titanfall more accessible to more players not by removing skill from the equation, but by letting players get value out of skills other than twitch reflexes. Not everyone is going to like that change, but for me, it just might be a game-changer."

— Kyle Orland, "The Smart Pistol is a Smart Addition"

Christian Donlan of Eurogamer praised the idea of the Smart Pistol in Titanfall, saying that he "never really saw a gun like [it] before". Stating that "it gets to the heart of why the game's already so much fun", he said that despite being "a poor online shooter player", the gun's auto-aim taught him what "get[ting] high on a headshot feels like". He also called the multiple lock-on feature "a lovely concept for fast-paced stealth - and it works great if you're cloaked", but singled out its implementation, citing the "curving red fishing line of light" that connects to targets on the HUD, as well as the "most satisfying of gun sounds - that sort of muted power-stapler fftunk!" Saying "the genius of all this [...] is that it allows weaker players to feel like assassins for a few seconds", he professed that the gun was "not unbalancing", but can show "what mastery can feel like".

Kyle Orland, Senior Gaming Editor of Ars Technica, also praised the Smart Pistol. Opining that he would usually not be able to sneak up on a player quickly enough due to "my general lack of fine aiming control", he contrasts using the Smart Pistol, which allows him to "keep him in my sights for the few seconds my Smart Pistol needs to achieve three "locks" on his position" and "kill him instantly with a homing headshot." Saying that "many see innovations like that Smart Pistol as just another example of the "dumbing-down" of the hardcore shooter experience", he nevertheless states that "the Smart Pistol is not the skill-free option some have made it out to be" and "requires stealth and planning". Calling it a "game-changer", he sums up his argument by stating that "the Smart Pistol makes Titanfall more accessible to more players not by removing skill from the equation, but by letting players get value out of skills other than twitch reflexes."

Dean Takahashi of VentureBeat also said that the addition of the Smart Pistol "is great for players like me, who are shooter fans but don't have the reflexes of youth". Chris Kohler of Wired said that the Smart Pistol was "a gun for people like me, people who have never gotten good at key important shooter concepts like, just to name one example, being able to aim a gun", adding that "in Titanfall, even I can kill you if you're being dumb enough". Andrew Webster of The Verge stated that the weapon "is a lot like the Titans themselves: it gives you an easy way to have some fun, but nothing feels overpowering."

However, some fans of the series have been noted to consider it "heresy" that such a weapon exists in a high-skill game. Daniel Perez of Shacknews stated that "many original Titanfall players were hoping the plans for the Smart Pistol would be crushed by a giant mech", prior to the gun's return in Titanfall 2.

Charlie Hall of Polygon noted the Smart Pistol's resemblance to the TrackingPoint Precision Guided Firearm, an integrated rifle optics system that allows users to hit targets with "tremendous accuracy". Calling the system "eerily similar", he stated that "comparing fictional versions to their real-world analogues is always useful to consider".

Dylan Warman of Screen Rant stated that the Smart Weapons of Cyberpunk 2077 were inspired by the Smart Pistol in their ability to lock onto a target regardless of where the barrel is pointed.
