= Precision-guided firearm =

System for improving long-range accuracy

Precision guided firearms (PGFs) are long-range rifle systems designed to improve the accuracy of shooting at targets at extended ranges through target tracking, heads-up display, and advanced fire control. Inspired by missile lock-on and fighter jet technology, the application of PGF technology to small arms mitigates multiple sources of marksman error including mis-aim, trigger jerk and shot setup miscalculation. PGFs can significantly increase first shot success probability (FSSP) out to extreme ranges of 1,100 meters or more.

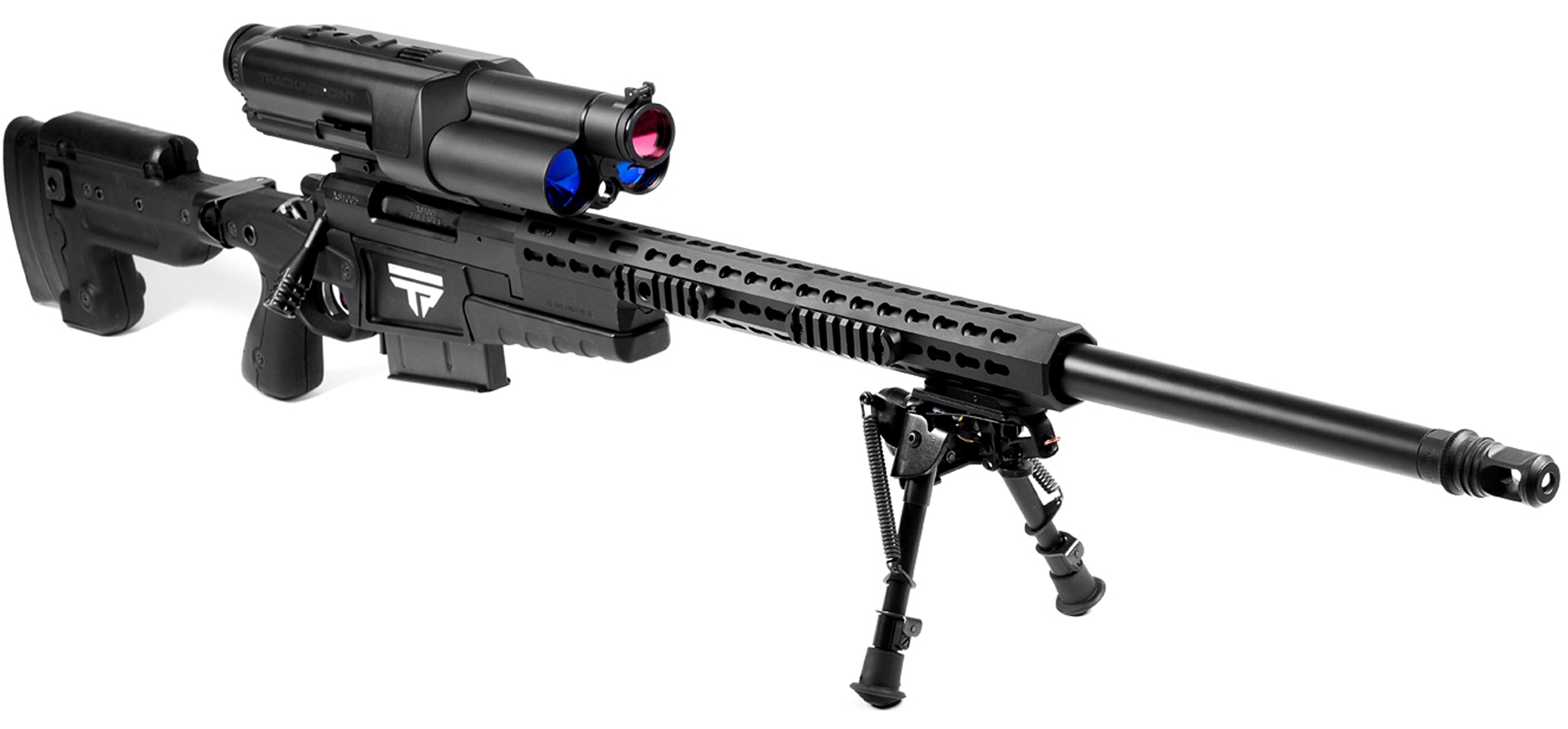
The TrackingPoint XS1, a precision guided firearm

PGFs are fully integrated systems consisting of a rifle, networked tracking scope, guided trigger and precision conventional ammunition based on standard caliber bolt action or semi-automatic rifles. Wireless connectivity allows PGFs to integrate with local and wide area networks to provide voice, video and data connectivity to remotely connected devices and systems.

Precision-guided small arms prototypes have been developed which use a laser designator to guide an electronically actuated bullet to a target. Another system in development uses a laser range finder to trigger an explosive small arms shell in proximity to a target. As of 2009, the U.S. Army has plans to use such devices in the future.

In 2008 the EXACTO program began under DARPA to develop a "fire and forget" smart sniper rifle system including a guided smart bullet and improved scope. The exact technologies of this smart bullet have not been released. EXACTO was test fired in 2014 and 2015 and results showing the bullet alter course to correct its path to its target were released.

In 2012 Sandia National Laboratories announced a self-guided bullet prototype that could track a target illuminated with a laser designator.

In mid-2016, Russia revealed it was developing a similar "smart bullet" weapon designed to hit targets at a distance of up to 10 kilometres (6.2 mi).

In 2019, Israel started using the SMASH Handheld also known as Dagger, also known as Pegion, made by SmartShooter, which is based on the SMASH 2000. In 2024, the British armed forces signed a £4.6 million contract to purchase Israeli SMASH Smart Shooter rifle attachments, also known as a counter-unmanned aircraft system (C-UAS). By 2024, it was also in use by the USA, India, and other countries.

Air burst grenade launchers are a type of precision-guided weapons. Such grenade launchers can preprogram their grenades using a fire-control system to explode in the air above or beside the enemy.

== History ==
The three main technologies employed for long-range shooting—the bolt-action rifle, telescopic rifle scope and machined cartridge ammunition—were developed in the nineteenth century. The first bolt-action rifle was produced in 1824 by the German firearms inventor Johann Nicolaus von Dreyse. The first documented telescopic rifle sight was developed between 1835 and 1840 by the American Morgan James. Machined metal-cased cartridge ammunition was first adopted by the British in 1867.

== System requirements ==
To qualify as a precision guided firearm, the system must:

- Be a complete firing system – rifle, ammunition and networked tracking scope
- Persistently track the target, automatically compute a multi-variable firing solution, and ensure precise engagement when target and firing solution are optimally aligned

== Technology ==
The precision guided firearm integrates technology commonly found in drones, tanks, jet fighters, smartphones and microprocessors, into the conventional system.

The following technologies can be integrated in a PGF system:

- Target acquisition, either through manual designation or auto-acquisition
- Lock on and persistent target tracking
- Computerized firing solution calculation involving ranging and multi-variable ballistic calculation
- Streaming video via wifi server, allowing another user to see the live feed from the system
- Shot recording and transference to other media applications
- Automatic zero adjustment
- Interface with smartphones, tablets and software applications

== Applications ==
PGFs are designed for use in safari and other wildlife hunting, wildlife management and predator/animal control, long-range sport shooting competitions and military and/or law enforcement sniper use.

== See also ==
- Glossary of firearms terms
- Smart gun
