= Runa Sandvik =

Privacy and security researcher (born 1987)

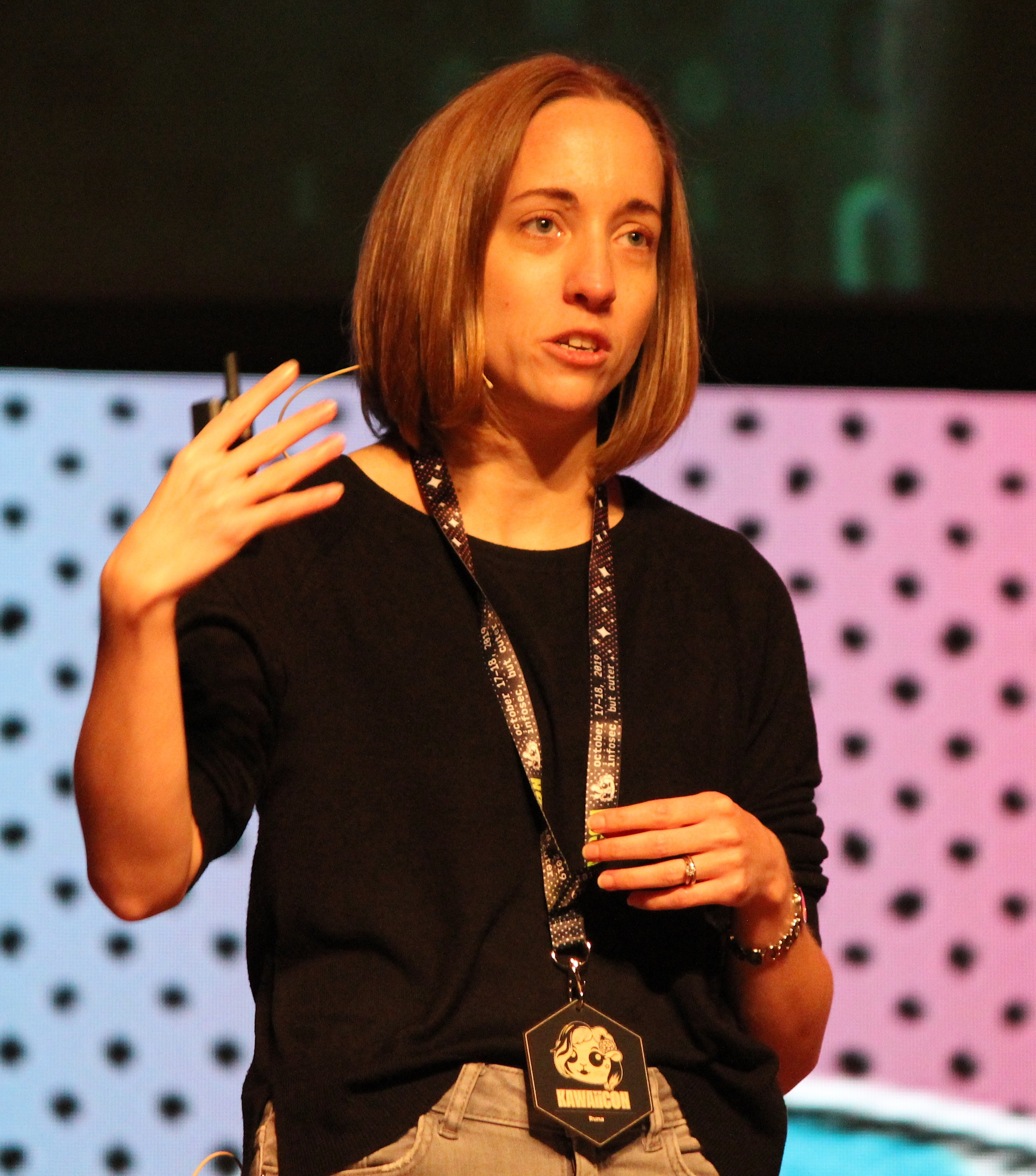
- Runa Sandvik at Kawaiicon 2019 in Wellington, New Zealand
- Born: 1987 (age 38–39); Oslo, Norway
- Occupations: Computer security expert, founder
- Spouse: Michael Auger

Runa Sandvik is a Norwegian-American computer security expert and founder of Granitt. She is noted for her extensive work in protecting at-risk civil society groups, including human rights defenders, lawyers, and journalists. Sandvik was previously the Senior Director of Information Security at The New York Times, helping launch the company’s confidential tips page in December 2016.

== Career ==
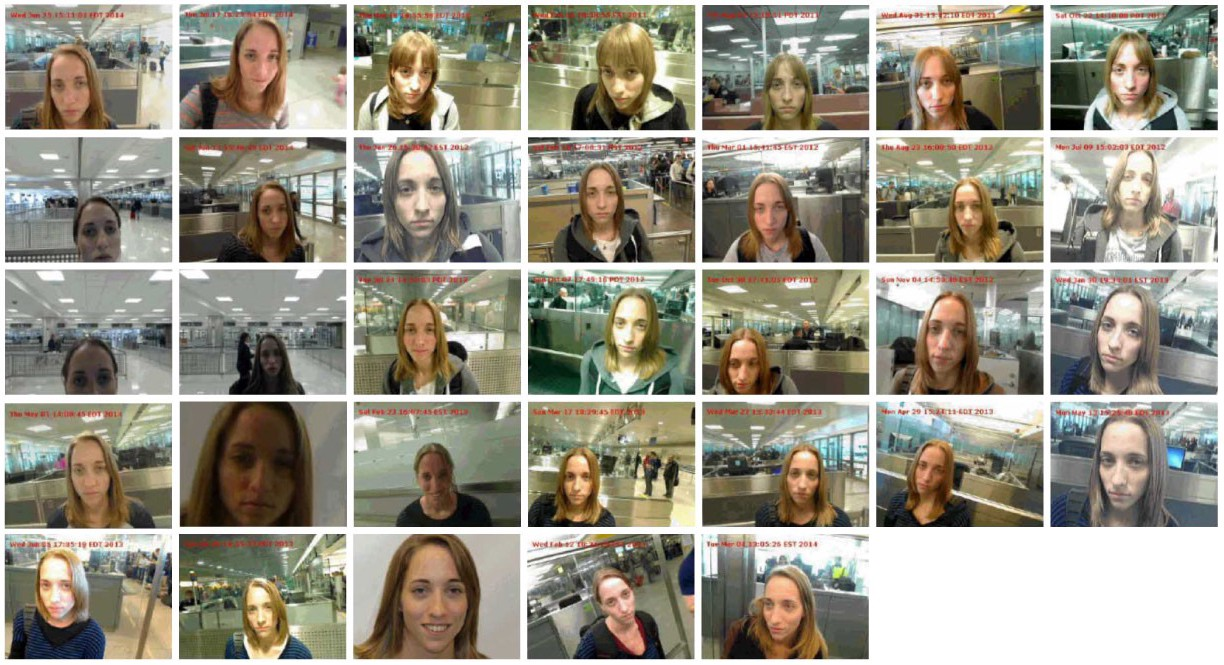
33 US Department of Homeland Security photos, acquired through FOIA

Sandvik was an early developer of the Tor anonymity network, a cooperative facility that helps individuals obfuscate the Internet Protocol information they are using to access the Internet. Sandvik is a technical advisor to the Freedom of the Press Foundation and serves on the review board of Black Hat Europe. Sandvik interviewed Edward Snowden in May 2014. In February 2015 Sandvik documented her efforts to retrieve information about herself through Freedom of Information Act requests. Sandvik led efforts to make The New York Times a Tor Onion service, allowing Times employees and readers to access the newspaper's site in ways that impede intrusive government monitoring.

=== Hacking of smart rifles ===
Sandvik, and her husband, Michael Auger, demonstrated how smart rifles with remote access can be remotely hacked. The $13,000 TrackingPoint sniper rifle is equipped with an embedded Linux computer. According to Wired magazine, when used according to its specifications, the aiming computer can enable a novice to hit remote targets that would otherwise require a skilled marksman. However the manufacturers designed the aiming computer with WiFi capabilities, so the shooter could upload video of their shots. Sandvik and Auger found they could initiate a Unix shell command line interpreter, and use it to alter parameters the aiming computer relies on, so that it will always miss its targets. They found that a knowledgeable hacker could use the shell to acquire root access. Acquiring root access allowed an interloper to erase all the aiming computer's software—"bricking" the aiming computer.

== Personal life ==
Sandvik acquired her first computer when she was fifteen years old. She studied computer science at the Norwegian University of Science and Technology. In 2014, Sandvik married Michael Auger, and the two later relocated to Washington, D.C.
