= Suzhou Oriental Semiconductor =

Chinese semiconductor company

Suzhou Oriental Semiconductor Co., Ltd (Chinese: 苏州东微半导体有限公司), abbreviated as Oriental Semiconductor (Chinese: 东微半导体), was founded in 2008, located in SIP, Suzhou, China. It invented the world's first semi-floating gate transistor (SFGT) with Fudan University in Shanghai. The related research paper was published on Science on August 9, 2013.

== See also ==
- FJG RAM
