= M2010 Enhanced Sniper Rifle =

US bolt-action sniper rifle

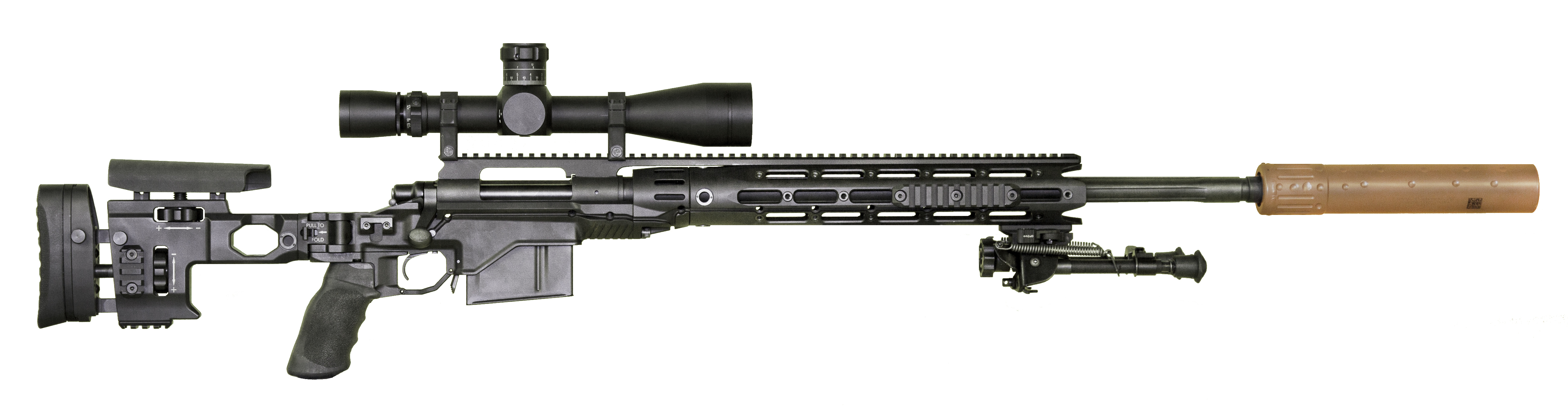
- Type: Sniper rifle
- Place of origin: United States

Service history
- In service: 2011–present
- Used by: See Users

Production history
- Designed: 2010
- Manufacturer: Remington Arms
- Produced: 2010–2014
- No. built: 2,558

Specifications
- Mass: 12.1 lb (5.5 kg)
- Length: 46.5 in (1,180 mm)
- Barrel length: 24 in (610 mm)
- Cartridge: .300 Winchester Magnum
- Action: Bolt-action
- Effective firing range: 1,200 m (1,312 yd)
- Feed system: 5-round detachable box magazine

The M2010 Enhanced Sniper Rifle (ESR), formerly known as the XM2010 and M24 Reconfigured Sniper Weapon System, is a bolt action sniper rifle developed by PEO Soldier for the United States Army. It is derived from and replaced the M24 Sniper Weapon System, and was designed to give snipers longer range in the mountainous and desert terrain of the War in Afghanistan. After winning a bidding process, Remington was awarded the production contract for up to 3,600 weapons. The Army had anticipated sending the upgraded weapons to deployed snipers in late 2010, but later expected fielding would happen in January 2011. The M2010 fires .300 Winchester Magnum (7.62×67mm) ammunition that offers about 50 percent greater effective range than the M24's 7.62×51mm NATO. This chambering to dimensionally larger cartridges is possible because the M24 was designed to use the "long action" bolt version of the Remington 700 receiver for cartridges up to 3.34 inches (84.84 mm) in overall length.

== History ==
The Barrett M107 .50 BMG rifle can hit targets past 2,000 m (2,187 yd), but it is accurate to 2.5 MOA, meaning it would hit within a 25 in (640 mm) area at 1,000 m (1,094 yd). This was acceptable for shooting at materiel, but not people. The XM2010 addressed the problem with a .300 Winchester Magnum round that can hit targets out to 1,200 m (1,312 yd) with a 1 MOA accuracy, half again further than the M24's 800 m (875 yd).

On 20 September 2010, the Army gave Remington a $28 million contract to rebuild 3,600 M24 rifles. By January, 250 had been ordered to be changed.

The U.S. Army issued three XM2010s to snipers at the United States Army Sniper School on 18 January 2011 and began using the rifle in combat in Afghanistan in March 2011. Snipers in the field learned how to use and maintain the new rifle during a three-day course. After the course, snipers had no difficulty hitting targets out to 1,000 meters from "ridgetop to ridgetop". In addition to the more powerful cartridge, the new optic improves the rifle's ability to sight a target quickly without calculations of range estimation.

All 250 XM2010 rifles were to be fielded in eight Brigade Combat Teams by mid-May 2011. Based on the results and feedback from troops, the U.S. Army decided in May 2011 to replace its entire fleet of M24s, ordering a total of 2,558 M2010 rifles. By September 2012, the Army had fielded more than 1,400 systems as part of an urgent material release. The M2010 achieved Type Classification-Standard in July 2013 and Full Materiel Release in September 2013, supporting procurement for the balance of the Army requirement. On 25 April 2014, the 2,558th M2010 rifle was completed.

=== Precision guided firearm testing ===
In January 2014, the Army bought six "smart scopes" made by TrackingPoint for testing on the M2010 sniper rifle. Costing between $22,000 and $27,000, the computerized scope marks a selected target, gathers and compensates for external factors, and uses a special trigger that does not pull until the system is sure the bullet will land where intended. It can help a bolt-action rifle to hit targets out to 1,250 yd (1,143 m). It is intended to help non-snipers take shots at longer ranges, not replace sniping skills.

=== Replacement plans ===
The U.S. Army plans to field the Barrett Mk22 MRAD (Multi-Role Adaptive Design) in 2021 to eventually replace the M2010. This bolt-action weapon can be user field converted to fire 7.62×51mm NATO, .300 Norma Magnum and .338 Norma Magnum. With the Norma Magnum chambering options, the Mk22 can shoot out to 1,500 m (1,640 yd), 300 m (328 yd) further than the M2010 Enhanced Sniper Rifle.

== Design details ==
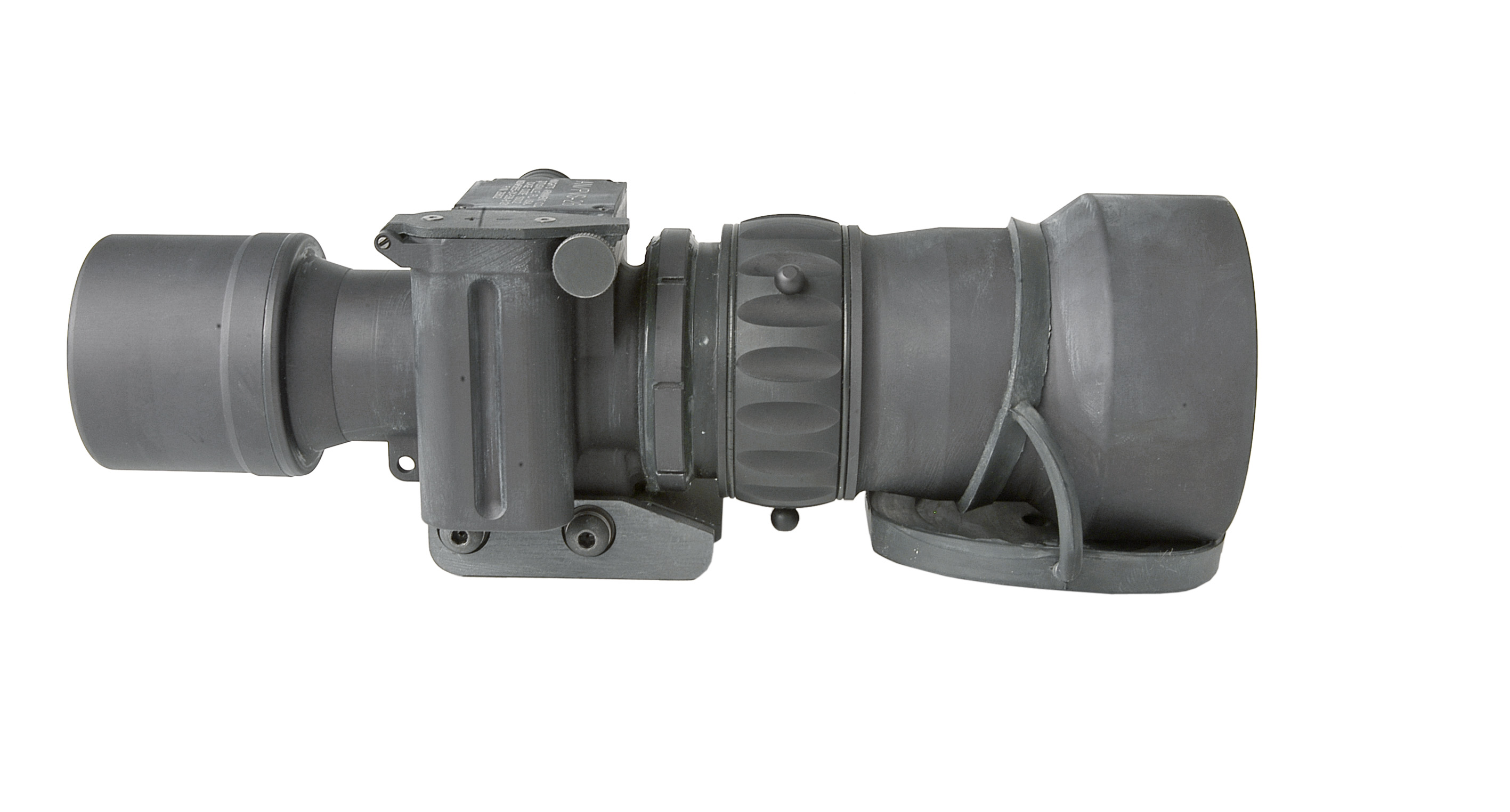
AN/PVS-30 Clip-on Sniper Night Sight.

The M2010 Enhanced Sniper Rifle differs from 7.62×51mm NATO chambered M24 Sniper Weapon System in that M2010 sniper weapons are:

- Chambered to .300 Winchester Magnum.
- Barreled to a 24 in (610 mm) long, 1 in 10 inches (250 mm) twist rate (using Obermeyer 5-R rifling) hammer-forged free floating barrel.
- Fitted with a new chassis (stock) assembly that maximizes the amount of physical adjustments for the sniper to provide a better user customized fit. The chassis has a right folding buttstock that shortens the system for easier transport and better concealment during movement and accommodates the mounting of accessories via removable Mil Std 1913 Picatinny Rails and accessory cables via routing channels.
- Fitted with a five-round detachable box magazine.
- Fitted with a quick-attachable/detachable Advanced Armament Corporation (AAC) sound suppressor with muzzle brake to reduce recoil and jump and audible and visible signature with an available thermal sleeve that reduces mirage effect on heated suppressors. The 10 in (254 mm) Titan-QD Fast-Attach suppressor eliminates 98 percent of muzzle flash, 60 percent of recoil, and reduces sound by 32 decibels.
- Fitted with a Leupold Mark 4 6.5–20×50mm ER/T M5A2 Front Focal variable power telescopic sight featuring a 34 mm tube diameter, first focal plane Horus Vision H-58 grid system range estimation reticle and Bullet Drop Compensation, fielded with the AN/PVS-29 or AN/PVS-30 Clip-on Sniper Night Sight.
- The application of advanced corrosion resistant coatings throughout the system.

According to Remington Arms, each rifle is tested to meet (and typically exceeds) the requirement to fire ≤ 1 moa/0.3 mil (less than a 2-inch shot group at 200 yards (180 m)) before being released for fielding.

=== Ammunition ===
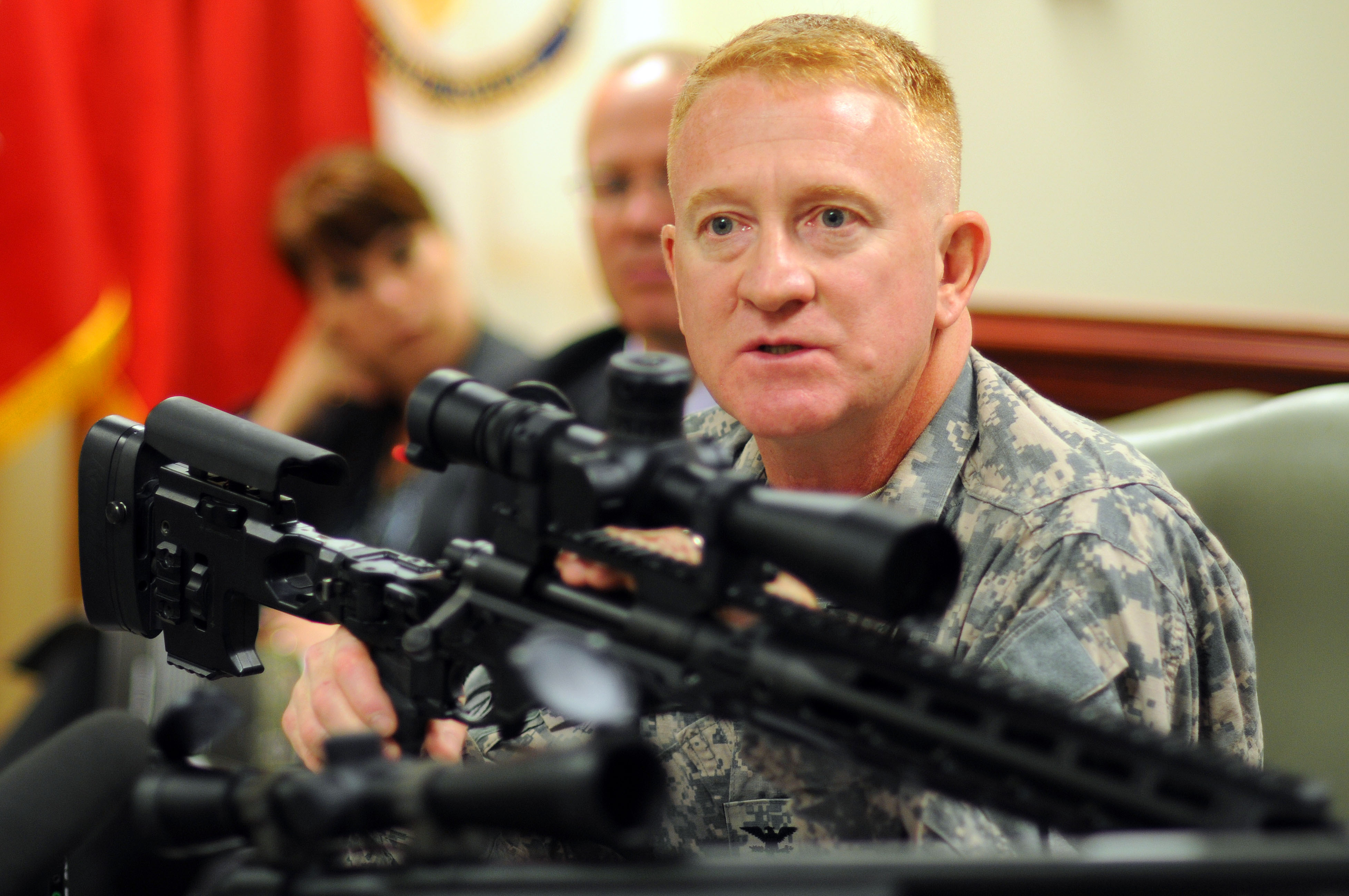
U.S. Army project manager for new weapons Colonel Douglas Tamilio with XM2010 in 2010

In 2009, the U.S. government purchased MK 248 MOD 1 .300 Winchester Magnum match-grade ammunition for use in .300 Winchester Magnum sniper rifles like the U.S. Navy Mk13 SWS or reconfigured M24 SWSs. This ammunition was developed as a .300 Winchester Magnum Match Product Improvement (PIP) and uses the 14.26 g (220 gr) Sierra MatchKing Hollow Point Boat Tail (HPBT) very-low-drag bullet fired at a nominal muzzle velocity of 869 m/s (2,850 ft/s) ± 15.2 m/s (50 ft/s). According to the U.S. Navy, this ammunition should increase the maximum effective range of .300 Winchester Magnum sniper rifle systems to 1,370 m (1,500 yd), decrease wind deflection on bullets in flight, and use a reduced muzzle flash propellant that remains temperature stable across an operational temperature range of −32 to 74 °C (−26 to 165 °F).According to JBM Ballistics, using the 0.310 G7 ballistic coefficient provided by Bryan Litz, and a Weapon Employment Zone (WEZ) analysis of the XM2010 rifle with various .300 Winchester Magnum ammunition types by Bryan Litz, the MK 248 MOD 1 .300 Winchester Magnum cartridge, when fired at its nominal muzzle velocity of 869 m/s (2,850 ft/s), should have 1,286 to 1,289 m (1,406 to 1,410 yd) supersonic range under International Standard Atmosphere conditions at sea level (air density ρ = 1.225 kg/m^{3}).

In January 2014, the U.S. Department of Defense annual testing report found that the older A191 or MK 248 Mod 0 .300 Winchester Magnum service round loaded with aerodynamically less efficient 190 gr (12.32 g) Sierra MatchKing Hollow Point Boat Tail (HPBT) bullets (0.270 G7 ballistic coefficient provided by Bryan Litz) fired from the XM2010 demonstrated adequate performance and lethality. Live fire tests were conducted in March 2013 against ballistics gelatin, light material barriers, and other targets to determine the projectile's ability to perforate targets. This was the first time the Pentagon's Director, Operational Test and Evaluation (DOT&E) tested the round, which can hit targets out to 1,200 m (1,312 yd).

== Civilian use ==
In March 2015, Remington Defense announced that they will start offering some of their products for sale on the civilian market. One of those products is the M2010 sniper rifle.

== Gallery ==
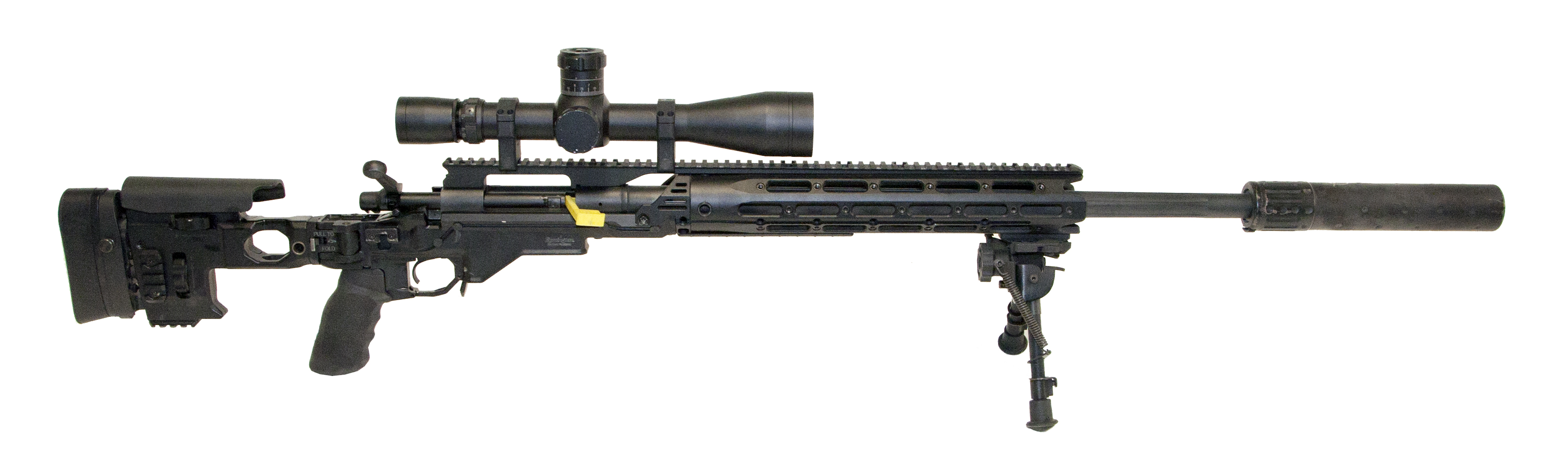
Right view of the M2010

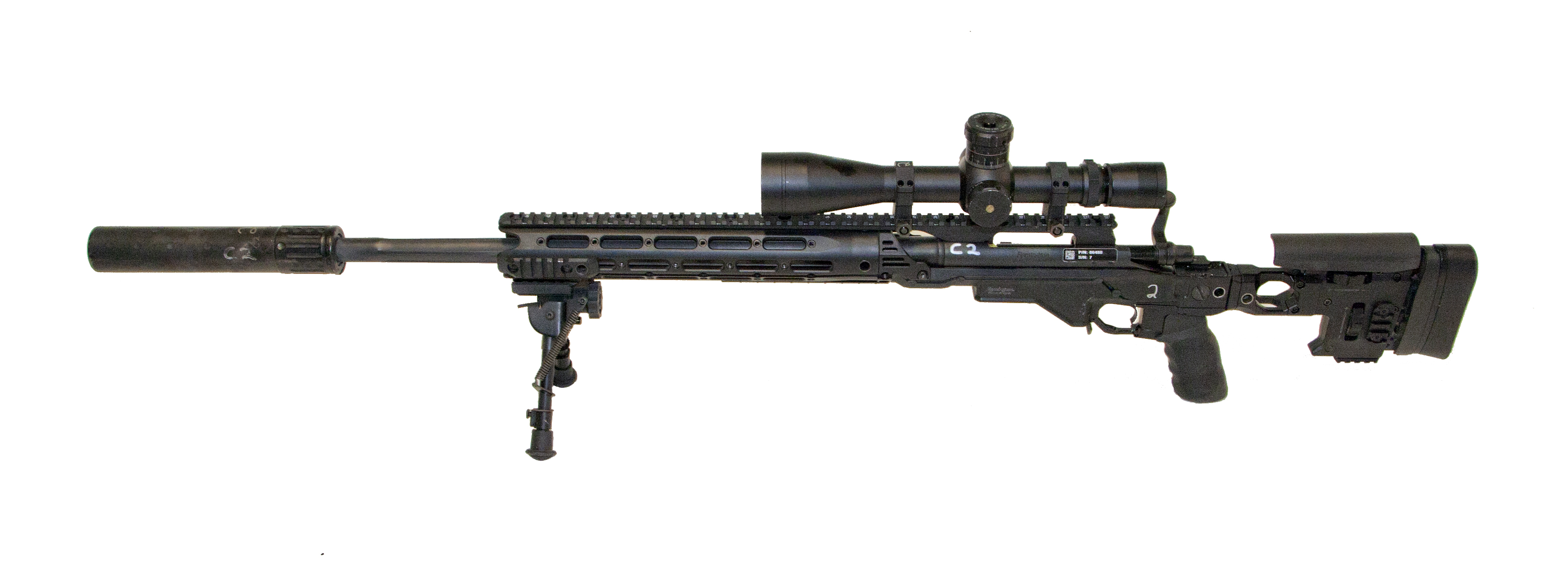
Left view of the M2010

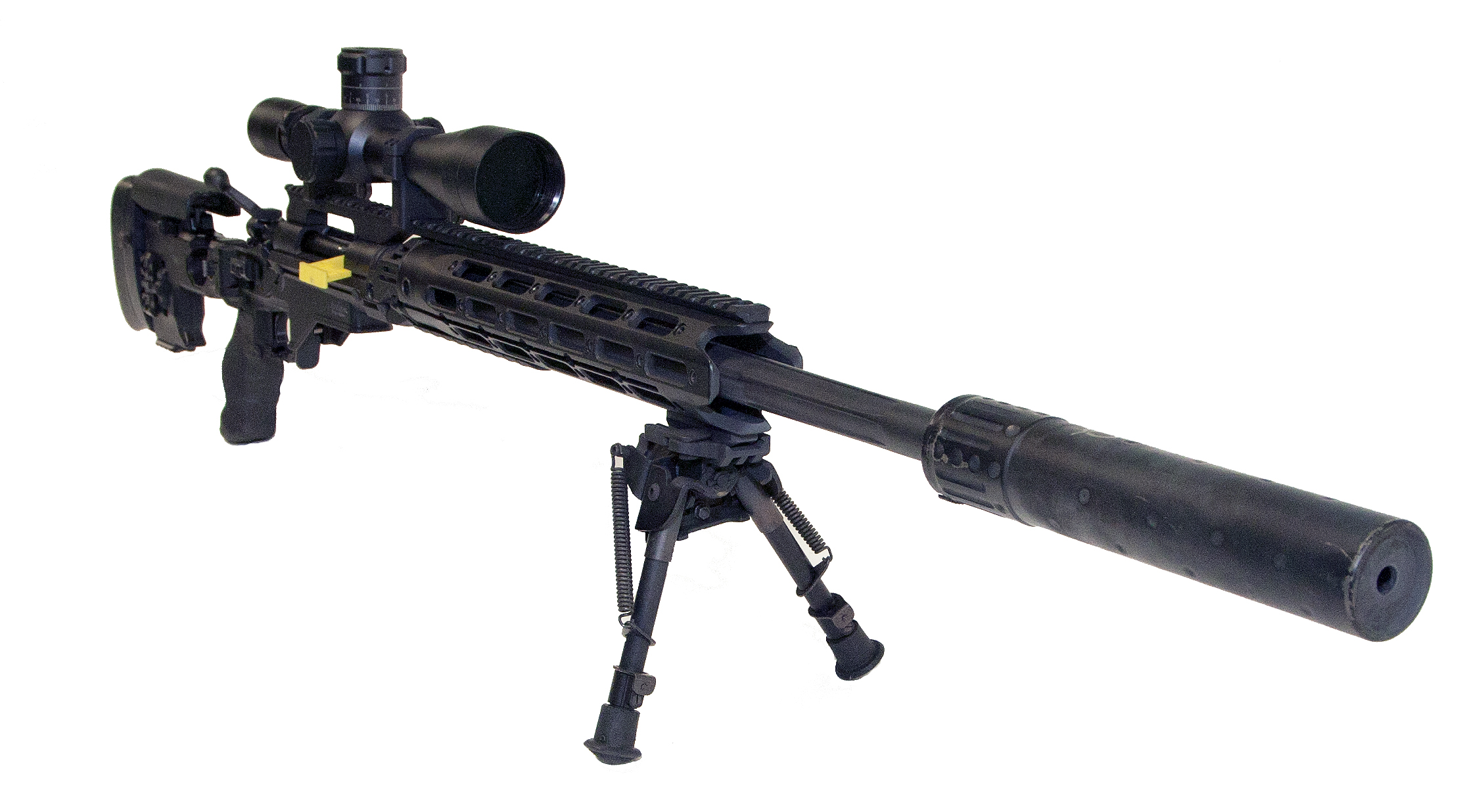
Right front view of the M2010

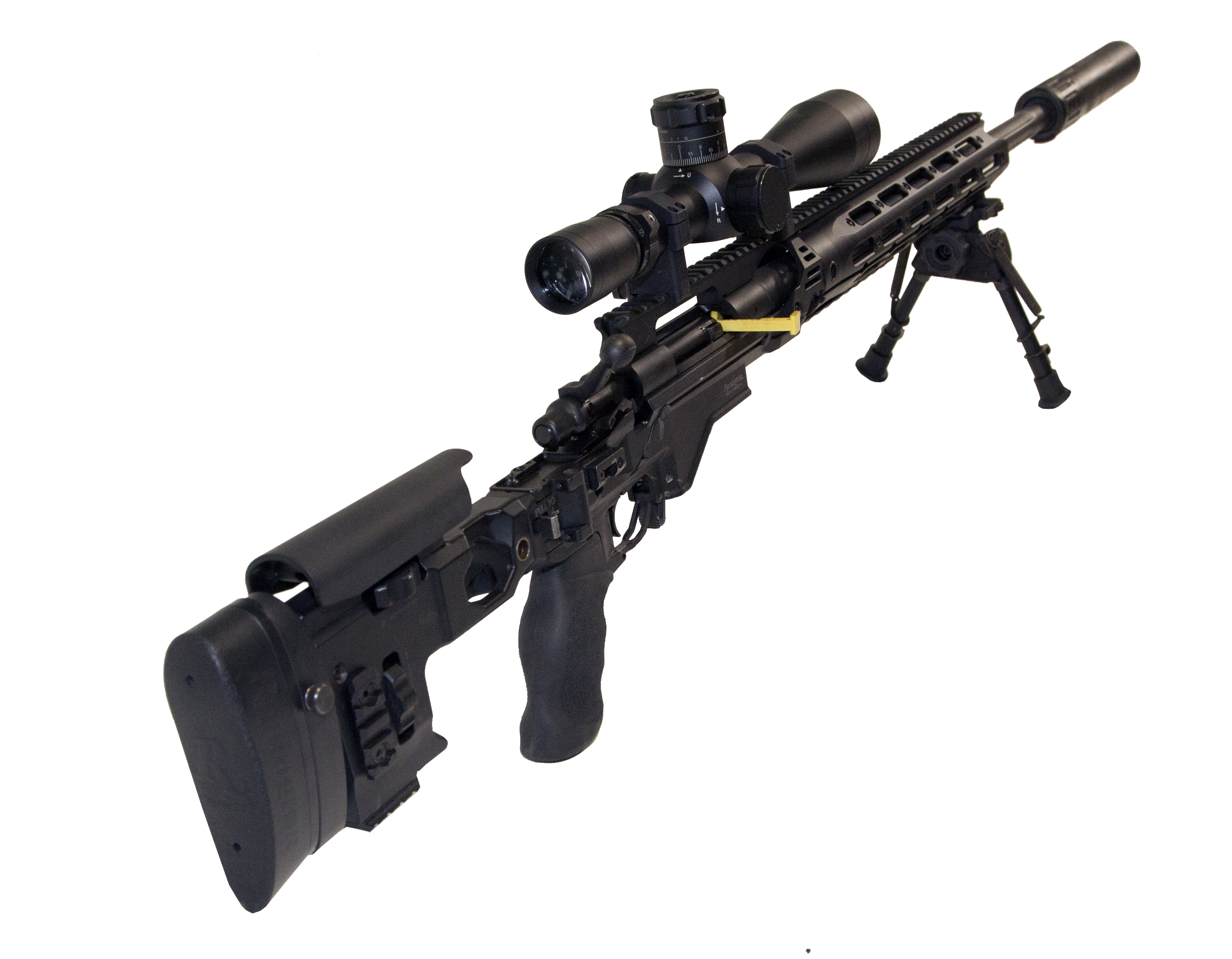
Right back view of the M2010

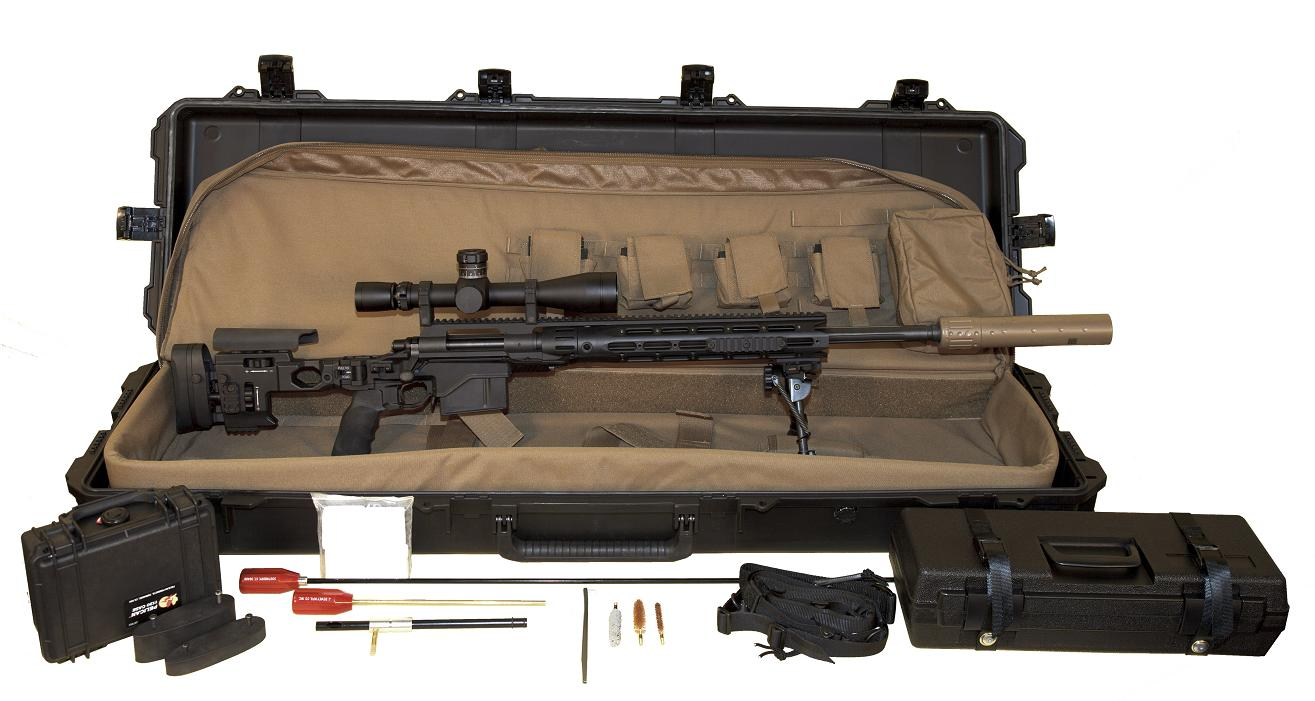
Rifle with case and maintenance kit

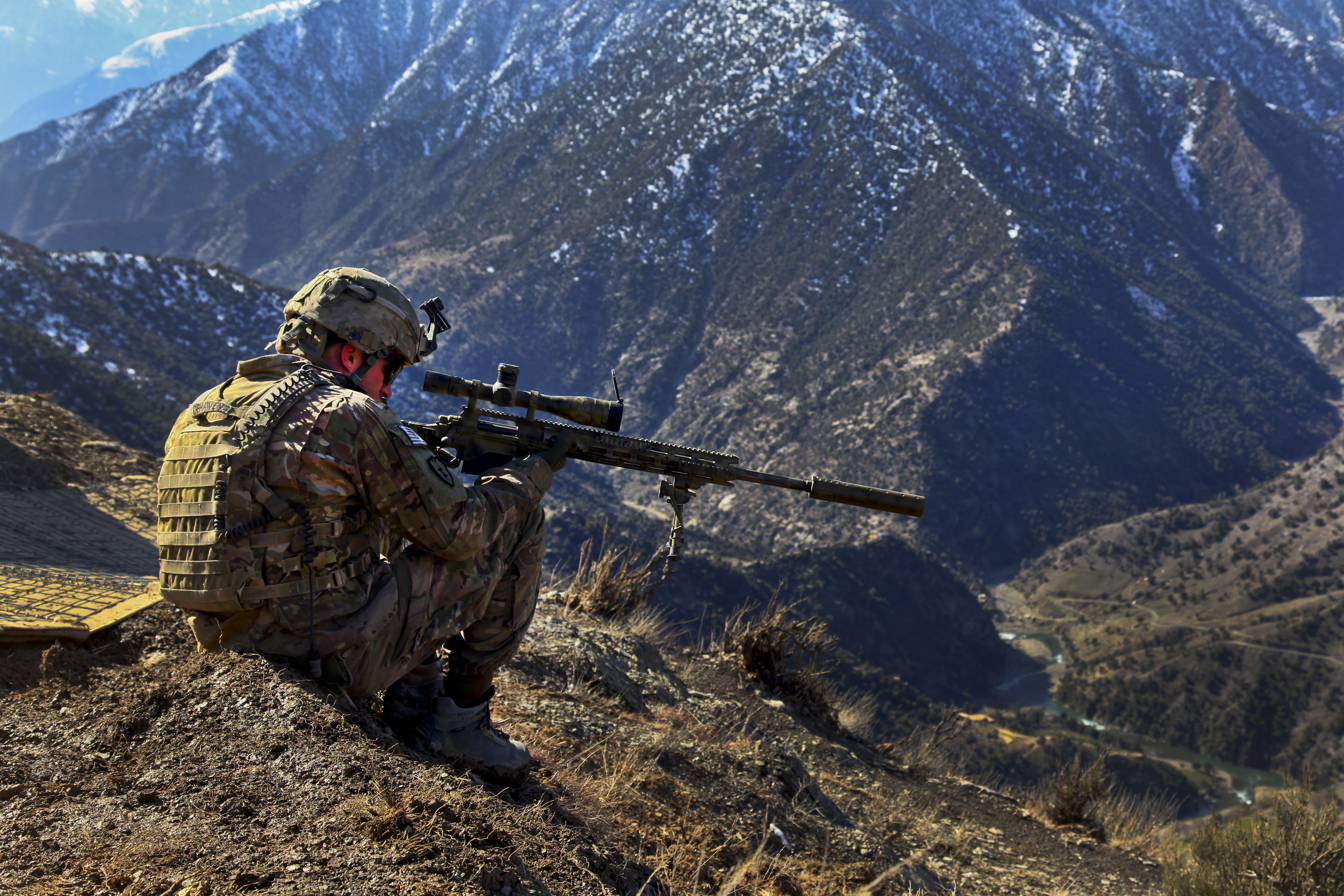
In US Army service in Afghanistan, February 2012

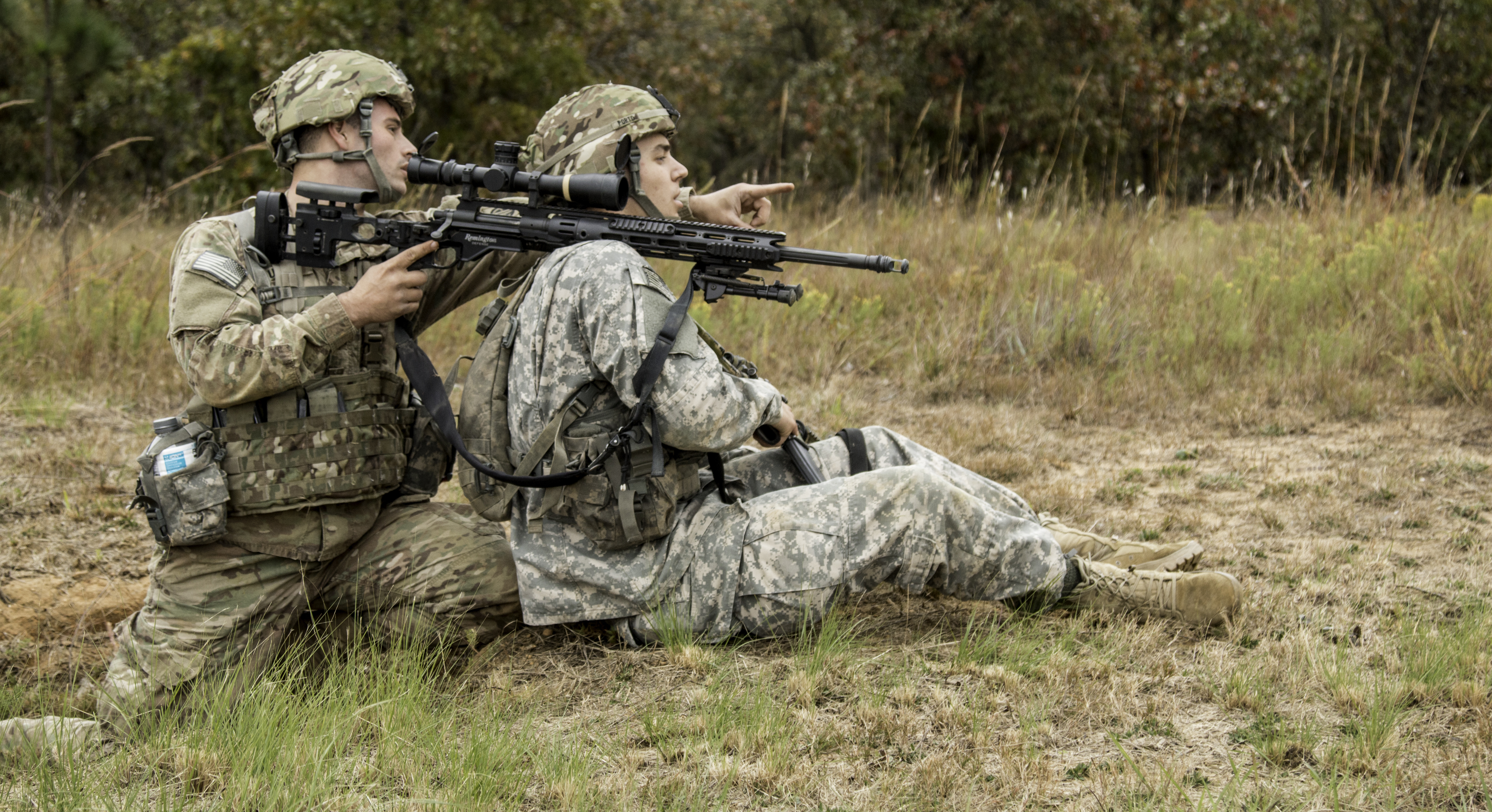
US sniper team train with an unsuppressed M2010, October 2015

== Users ==
- Colombia: Colombian Special Forces
- United States: United States Army

== See also ==
- Modular Sniper Rifle
