= Smartstore =

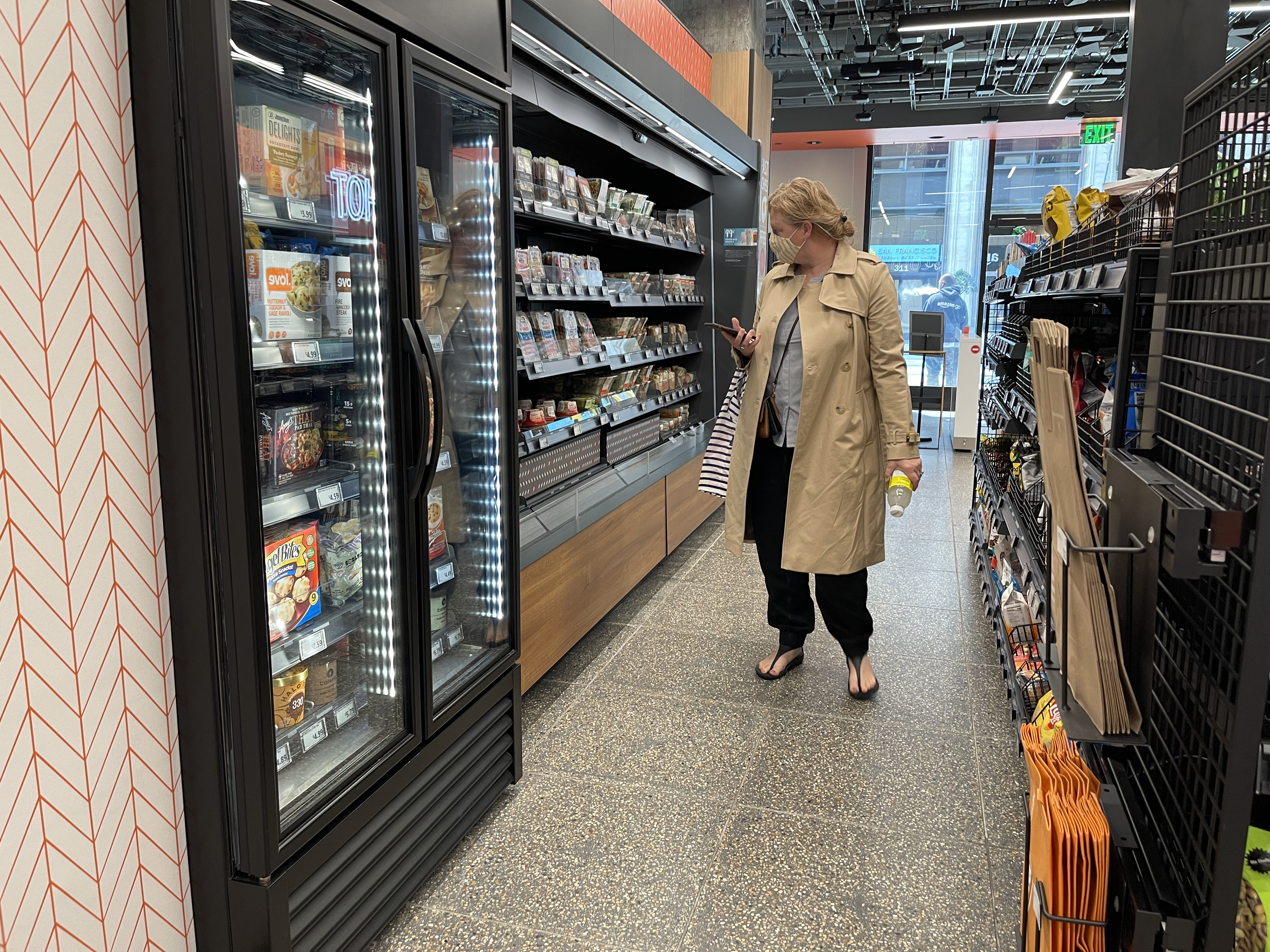
Amazon Go in San Francisco

A smartstore is a brick-and-mortar retail establishment using smart technologies like smart shelves, (Note: Shelves which detect and report when inventory is low.) smart carts, or smart cards. Smartstores usually deliver their services via the Web, smart phone apps, and augmented reality applications in real stores.

The intention behind the adoption of such technologies is to enhance the productivity of store space and inventory. For example, RFID technology allows for the use of kiosks and self-checkout terminals, with RFID keeping track of all incoming and outgoing products. Smartstore technologies also offers consumer personalization, with retailers able to cater to individual consumers' preferences and potentially provide more product information.

Notable smartstores today include SmartMart, Metro Group Future Store and BGN (Boekhandels Groep Nederland). Amazon Go was unveiled as a prototype in 2016.
