= Humavox =

Israeli company

- Type: Private
- Industry: Wireless power
- Founded: 2010
- Founder: Omri Lachman and Asaf Elssibony
- Headquarters: Israel
- Products: ETERNA
- Website: www.humavox.com

Humavox Ltd. is an Israeli startup that has developed a radio frequency (RF) based wireless charging technology for wearables, hearables, IoT, enterprise, consumer electronics and healthcare devices, including hearing aids. Humavox's hardware platform, ETERNA, will be licensed to device manufacturers to enable wireless charging of their devices.

== History ==
Humavox was founded in 2010 by CEO Omri Lachman and VP Innovation Asaf Elssibony.

In 2014, the company was awarded the ECN Impact award and Frost & Sullivan Gil award for Technology Innovation Leadership.

In 2016, the company joined the Airfuel Alliance and holds the vice chair position in the Uncoupled Power Working Group (UPG).

In June 2016, Humavox merged with Australian company Aurum Inc. and raised 16 million dollars in the merger.

== Technology ==
The company's technology is based on radio frequency (RF) wireless charging. It uses a power transmitter (NEST) that transmits RF waves over a broad band of frequency waves, and a receiver (Thunderlink), which is embedded in the target device. The receiver consumes the RF energy and converts it to voltage to wirelessly charge the battery. The company also uses an algorithm (ETERNA Charging Optimizer) to ensure effective Rx and Tx coupling and to control the charging process.
