= 3rd Space Vest =

Video game accessory

- Name: 3rd Space Gaming Vest
- Developer: TNgames
- Released: November 2007
- Platforms: PC

The ForceWear Vest is a haptic suit that was unveiled at the Game Developers Conference in San Francisco in March 2007. The vest was mentioned in several articles about next-generation gaming accessories. The vest was released in November 2007, and reviews of the product have been generally favorable.

The vest uses eight trademarked "contact points" that simulate gunfire, body slams or G-forces associated with race car driving. It is unique because unlike traditional force feedback accessories, the vest is directional, so that action taking place outside the players' field of view can also be felt. A player hit by gunfire from behind will actually feel the shot in his back while he may not be otherwise aware of this using standard visual display cues.

Gaming reporter Charlie Demerjian of The Inquirer said, "If they can keep the price reasonable and have a few good games, this has a chance of becoming a useful gaming accessory." Currently, players have three ways to utilize the vest. Playing games with Direct Integration, such as TN Games' own 3rd Space Incursion, using the 3rd space game drivers whilst playing a game (drivers currently in Beta 2), or installing specially made mods for a game. The vest works with many games, including Call of Duty 2: 3rd Space Edition, 3rd Space Incursion, Half-Life 2: Episodes 1 & 2, Crysis, Enemy Territory Quake Wars, Clive Barker's Jericho, Unreal Tournament 3, F.E.A.R., Medal of Honor: Airborne, Quake 4 and Doom 3.
