= Nanoradio =

Radio transmitter using nanotechnology

A nanoradio (also called carbon nanotube radio) is a nanotechnology acting as a radio transmitter and receiver by using nanomaterials. Common materials used in the construction of include carbon nanotubes, graphene, and carbon nanofibers. One of the first nanoradios was constructed in 2007 by researchers under Alex Zettl at the University of California, Berkeley where they successfully transmitted an audio signal. Due to the small size, nanoradios can have several possible applications such as radio function in the bloodstream.The research and development of nanoradios is still undergoing.

== History ==
The first observation of a nanoradio can be accredited to a Japanese physicist Sumio Iijima in 1991 who saw a "a luminous discharge of electricity" coming from a carbon nanotube on a graphite electrode. On October 31, 2007, a team of researchers under Alex Zettl at the University of California, Berkeley created one of the first nanoradios. Their experiment consisted of placing a multilayered nanotube placed on a silicon electrode and connecting it to a counter electrode through a wire and a DC battery. Both the electrode and nanotube were also put in a vacuum of about 10^{−7} Torr. They then placed the apparatus into a high-resolution transmission electron microscope to document the movement of the nanotube. They observed the nanoradio vibrating and transmitted a song called "Layla" by Eric Clapton. After some minor adjustments, the team was able to transmit and receive signals from a couple meters across the laboratory; however, the initial audio receptions from the radio were scratchy which Zettl believed was due to the lack of a better vacuum.

== Properties ==
The small size, roughly 10 nanometers wide and hundreds of nanometers long, and composition of nanoradios provide several distinct properties. The small size of nanoradios enables electrons to pass through without much friction, making nanoradios efficient conductors. Nanoradios can also come in different sizes; they can be double-walled, tripled-walled and multi-walled. Aside from the different sizes, nanoradios can also take different shapes such as bent, straight or toroidal. Common among all nanoradios is how relatively strong they are. The resistance can be attributed to the strength of the bonds between carbon atoms.

== Function ==
The fundamental parts of a radio are the antenna, tuner, demodulator and amplifier. Carbon nanotubes are special in that they can function as these parts without the need of extra circuitry.

=== Antenna ===
The nanoradio is small enough for electromagnetic signals to mechanically vibrate the nanoradio. The nanoradio essentially acts as an antenna by vibrating with the same frequency as the signal from incoming electromagnetic waves; this is in contrast with traditional radio antennas, which are generally stationary. The nanotube can vibrate in high frequencies, from "thousands to millions of times per second."

=== Tuner ===
The nanoradio can also function as a tuner by extending or reducing the length of the nanotube; doing so changes the resonance frequency at which it vibrates, enabling the radio to tune into specific frequencies. The length of the nanotube can be extended by pulling the tip with a positive electrode and can be shortened by removing atoms off the tip. Consequently, changing the length is permanent and can't be reversed; however, the method of varying the electric field can also affect the frequency that the nanoradio responds without being permanent.

=== Amplifier ===
As a benefit of the microscopic size and needle-like shape, the nanoradio functions naturally as an amplifier. The nanoradio exhibits field emission, in which a small voltage emits a flow of electrons; due to this, a small electromagnetic wave would produce a large flow of electrons, amplifying the signal.

=== Demodulator ===
Demodulation is essentially the separation of the information signal from the carrier wave. When the nanoradio vibrates in sync with the carrier wave, the nanoradio responds only to the information signal and ignores the carrier wave; and so, the nanoradio can act as a demodulator without the need of circuitry.

== Medical Application ==
Currently, chemotherapy uses chemicals that harm not only cancerous cells, but also healthy ones since they are put into the blood stream. It is hypothesized that nanoradios can be used to prevent damage to healthy cells by remotely communicating with the radio to release drugs and specifically target cancerous cells, however this has yet to be done experimentally due to potential safety issues. Nanoradios can also be injected into individual cells to release certain chemicals, enabling repair of specific cells. Nanoradios can also be used to monitor insulin levels of diabetes patients and use that information to release a drug or chemical.

== Complications ==
The implanting of nanoradios in the body is now feasible with manipulation of directed energy. The nanoradio radiates about 4.5 × 10^{−27} W of electromagnetic power; however, much of this power is lost when passing through the body. The amount of energy input can be increased, which would generate much heat in the body, which can pose a safety risk.
