= Smart bullet =

Guided bullet

A smart bullet is a bullet that is able to do something other than simply follow its given trajectory, such as turning, changing speed or sending data. Such a projectile may be fired from a precision-guided firearm capable of programming its behavior. It is a miniaturized type of precision-guided munition.

== Types of smart bullets ==
In 2008 the EXACTO program began under DARPA to develop a "fire-and-forget" smart sniper rifle system including a guided smart bullet and improved scope. The exact technologies of this smart bullet have yet to be released. EXACTO was test fired in 2014 and 2015 and results showing the bullet altering course to correct its path to its target were released.

In 2012 Sandia National Laboratories announced a self-guided bullet prototype that could track a target illuminated with a laser designator. The bullet is capable of updating its position 30 times a second and hitting targets over a mile away.

In mid-2016, Russia revealed it was developing a similar "smart bullet" weapon designed to hit targets at a distance of up to 10 kilometres (6.2 mi).

== Guided bullet ==
The guided bullet was conceptualized by Dr. Rolin F. Barrett Jr. and patented in August 1998.

As first designed, the bullet would have three fiber-optic based eyes (at minimum, for three-dimensionality), evenly distributed about its circumference. To activate its guided nature, a laser is pointed at a target. As the bullet approaches its final destination, it adjusts its flight path in real time to allow an equivalent amount of light from the laser to enter each eye. The bullet would not travel in multiple directions as though it were an autonomous vehicle, but instead, would make small adjustments to its flight path to hit the target precisely where the laser was placed. Moreover, the laser would not have to originate from the source of the bullet, allowing the projectile to be fired at a target beyond visual range.

To allow the bullet to modify its flight path, the body was designed as a metal and polymer combination. The polymer would act as a deformable surface that would deflect the air-stream and steer the bullet in real time. The guidance system is powered by a miniature lithium-polymer battery that is connected to the navigational circuits.

Barrett went to great lengths to model the airflow of the bullet, studying butterflies with speed bumps to evaluate the effects of protruding surfaces. Due to a lack of ballistic programs at the time, custom simulations were written in Mathcad to solve for numerous flight variables. In addition to modeling the flight, the interior ballistics were modeled by continuously altering polynomial curves until they were in agreement with publicly available data. Due to a lack of available terminal ballistics data that would have been representative of the guided bullet, the data was compared to that of large game hunting bullets.

== Changing trajectory ==
One kind of smart bullet is a projectile that is capable of changing its course during flight. One use of this would be to enable soldiers to stay behind protective cover and shoot around corners. One implementation uses a spoiler and micro gyro to control the bullet.

== Navigating ==
Honeywell Aerospace has produced inertial measurement units based on MEMS and microelectronics technologies that it claims can survive the shock of being fired out of a gun.

== Transmitting data ==
Another type of smart bullet is one that can transmit data about the location that has been hit. A prototype has been created by researchers at the University of Florida in Gainesville, Florida, USA with funding from Lockheed Martin. The bullet (projectile) has the capability to send data up to a distance of 70 meters.

== See also ==
- Glossary of firearms terms
