= Physical Internet =

Logo for the Physical Internet Initiative circa 2011

In transportation, the Physical Internet refers to the combination of digital transportation networks that are deploying to replace actual road networks. The Physical Internet Initiative promoted research efforts around 2011. Since around 2018, the initiative site refers to a blog site promoting the marketing term big data.

== Initiative 2011–2018 ==
In logistics, the Physical Internet is an open global logistics system founded on physical, digital, and operational interconnectivity, through encapsulation, interfaces and protocols. The Physical Internet is intended to replace current logistical models.

Benoit Montreuil organized a project called the Physical Internet Initiative at the Université Laval in Canada around 2011. It applied concepts from internet data transfer to real-world shipping processes. A project had funding from the National Science Foundation as well as contributions from MHIA and CICMHE.

The Internet does not transmit information: it transmits packets with embedded information. These packets are designed for ease of use in the Digital Internet. The information within a packet is encapsulated and is not dealt with by Internet. The packet header contains all information required for identifying the packet and routing it correct to destination. A packet is constructed for a specific transmission and it is dismantled once it has reached its destination. The Digital Internet is based on a protocol structuring data packets independently from equipment. In this way, data packets can be processed by different systems and through various networks: modems, copper wires, fiber optic wires, routers, etc.; local area networks, wide area networks, etc.; Intranets, Extranets, Virtual Private Networks, etc.

The Physical Internet does not manipulate physical goods directly, whether they are materials, parts, merchandises or yet products. It manipulates exclusively containers that are explicitly designed for the Physical Internet and that encapsulate physical goods within them.

The vision of the Physical Internet involves encapsulating goods in smart, ecofriendly and modular containers ranging from the size of a maritime container to the size of a small box. It thus generalizes the maritime container that succeeded to support globalization and shaped ships and ports, and extends containerization to logistics services in general. The Physical Internet moves the border of the private space to be inside of the container instead of the warehouse or the truck. These modular containers will be continuously monitored and routed, exploiting their digital interconnection through the Internet of Things.

The Physical Internet encapsulates physical objects in physical packets or containers, hereafter termed π-containers so as to differentiate them from current containers. These π-containers are world-standard, smart, green and modular containers. They are notably modularized and standardized worldwide in terms of dimensions, functions and fixtures.

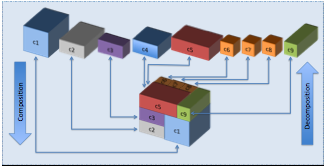
Figure 1. Illustrating the modularity of unitary and composite π-containers

The π-containers are key elements enabling the interoperability necessary for the adequate functioning of the Physical Internet. They must be designed to facilitate their handling and storage in the physical nodes of the Physical Internet, as well as their transport between these nodes and of course to protect goods. They act as packets in the digital Internet. They have an information part analogous to the header in the digital Internet. The π-containers encapsulate their content, making the contents irrelevant to the Physical Internet.

From a physical perspective, π-containers must be easy to handle, store, transport, seal, snap to a structure, interlock, load, unload, build and dismantle.

From an informational perspective, each π-container has a unique worldwide identifier, such as the MAC address in the Ethernet network and the digital Internet. This identifier is attached to each π-container both physically and digitally for ensuring identification robustness and efficiency. A smart tag is attached to each π-container to act as its representing agent. It contributes to ensuring π-container identification, integrity, routing, conditioning, monitoring, traceability and security through the Physical Internet. Such smart tagging enables the distributed automation of a wide variety of handling, storage and routing operations. In order to deal adequately with privacy and competitiveness concerns within the Physical Internet, the smart tag of a π-container strictly restricts information access by pertinent parties. Only the information necessary for the routing of π-containers through the Physical Internet are accessible for everyone.

== Research projects ==
A number of academic research projects were funded using this term.

=== Modulushca ===
The European Commission funded a project called Modular Logistics Units in Shared Co-modal Networks (Modulushca) from 1 October 2012 to 31 January 2016. Modulushca studied interconnected logistics at the European level, in coordination with North American partners and the international Physical Internet Initiative. The project studied interconnected logistics based on containerization for fast-moving consumer goods (FMCG) supply chains.

=== ICONET ===
A European Union project called New ICT infrastructure and reference architecture to support Operations in future PI Logistics NETworks (ICONET) explored PI network services that optimise cargo flows against throughput, cost and environmental performance.

ICONET's main research focus was collaborative planning of flexible logistic chains, by applying some popular computer network concepts of the time. ICONET was funded by the Innovation and Networks Executive Agency in Brussels from 1 September 2018 to 28 February 2021.

=== CELDi Physical Internet Project ===
Establishing the logistics system gain efficiency of the Physical Internet was the focus of a research project funded by the U.S. National Science Foundation (NSF) and conducted in the Center for Excellence in Logistics and Distribution (CELDi). The first phase report was published in 2012.

=== Atropine ===
The Fast Track to the Physical Internet (Atropine) project promised to demonstrate a Physical Internet region in Upper Austria. The project is managed by the Logistikum of the University of Applied Sciences Upper Austria from December 2015 to May 2018. It was funded by the Upper Austrian government program 'Innovatives Oberösterreich 2020'. Another research project in Austria was called Go2PI.

=== ALICE ===
The Alliance for Logistics Innovation through Collaboration in Europe (ALICE) supported some projects from 2018 to 2020.

=== AGEDA ===
The aim of the publicly funded project is to develop a standardized interface for vehicle as edge devices that implements the concepts of the GAIA-X initiative and the dynamic reconfiguration of vehicles with the example of the Road-Based Physical Internet (RBPI). The necessary measures to be carried out on vehicles for this purpose mean that the RBPI can be expected to be partially implemented by 2023.

=== Original equipment manufacturer ===
Also car manufacturer do research on the road-based Physical Internet. OEM, in particular Mercedes-Benz, work on architectures to integrate vehicles as edge devices into the Physical Internet ecosystem. The aim here is to create a cross-manufacturer standard to optimize the utilization of vehicle cargo spaces. The ecosystem of cloud storage, vehicles and freight components is called the Road-Based Physical Internet (RBPI).

== See also ==
- Internet
- Internet of things
- Logistics management
- Supply chain management
- Systems theory
- Fast-moving consumer goods
- Containerization
- Ecological footprint
- Economies of scale
- Just in time (business)
