= FJG RAM =

Novel type of computer memory

FJG RAM, short for Floating Junction Gate Random Access Memory, is a type of computer memory invented and subsequently patented in July 2009 by Oriental Semiconductor Electronics, Ltd.

According to Oriental Semiconductor researchers, the FJG ram has an ultra-compact cell area of 4-5F^{2} (F refers to feature size) and a capacitor-less cell configuration. The FJG RAM can be produced in existing standard dynamic RAM fabrication plants. Due to the absence of a capacitor, the FJG cell process is more compatible with logic processes, allowing its use in standalone DRAM applications as well as embedded-DRAM applications. Other properties include non-destructive-read and the possibility for DRAM designers to use shared sense amplifiers to reduce the complexity of peripheral circuits.

As of July 2023, there is little evidence of ongoing development or near-term commercialization efforts.

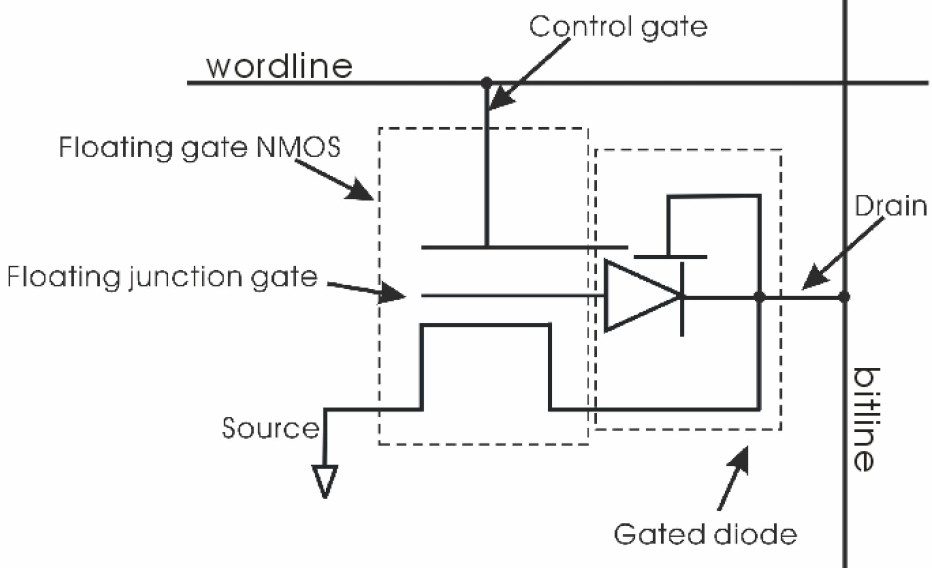
FJG diagrams
