= SMASH Handheld =

SMASH
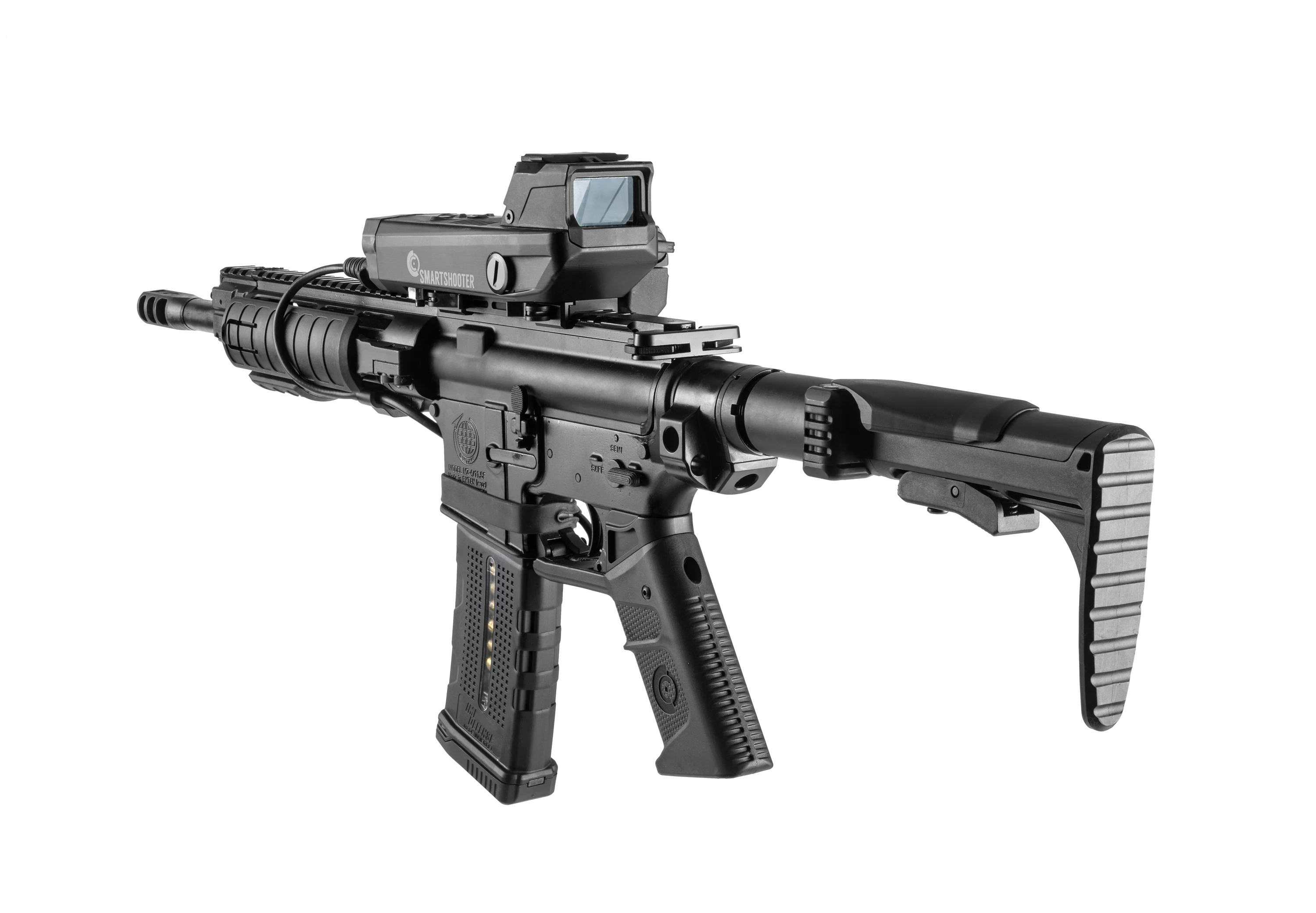
- Place of origin: Yagur, Israel

Service history
- Used by: Israel Defense Force
- Wars: Gaza war

Production history
- Designer: Michal Mor
- Manufacturer: SMARTSHOOTER Ltd.

Specifications
- Mass: 740 g (1.63 lb)
- Length: 64 mm X 73.5 mm X 75 mm

SMASH Handheld (Hebrew: פגיון, romanized: Pigyon) is a firearm-mounted fire-control system developed by the Israel-based company SMARTSHOOTER. The device is an external add-on solution that can be installed to most existing firearms. The Israel Defense Force praised the technology and described the device as "groundbreaking" after its successful use in the Gaza war, claiming it quadruples the chances of hitting the target, and thousands have already been used by the soldiers in the Gaza Strip. In 2011, Smart Shooter raised 20 million dollars in a seed venture funding.

== Mechanisms and functionality ==
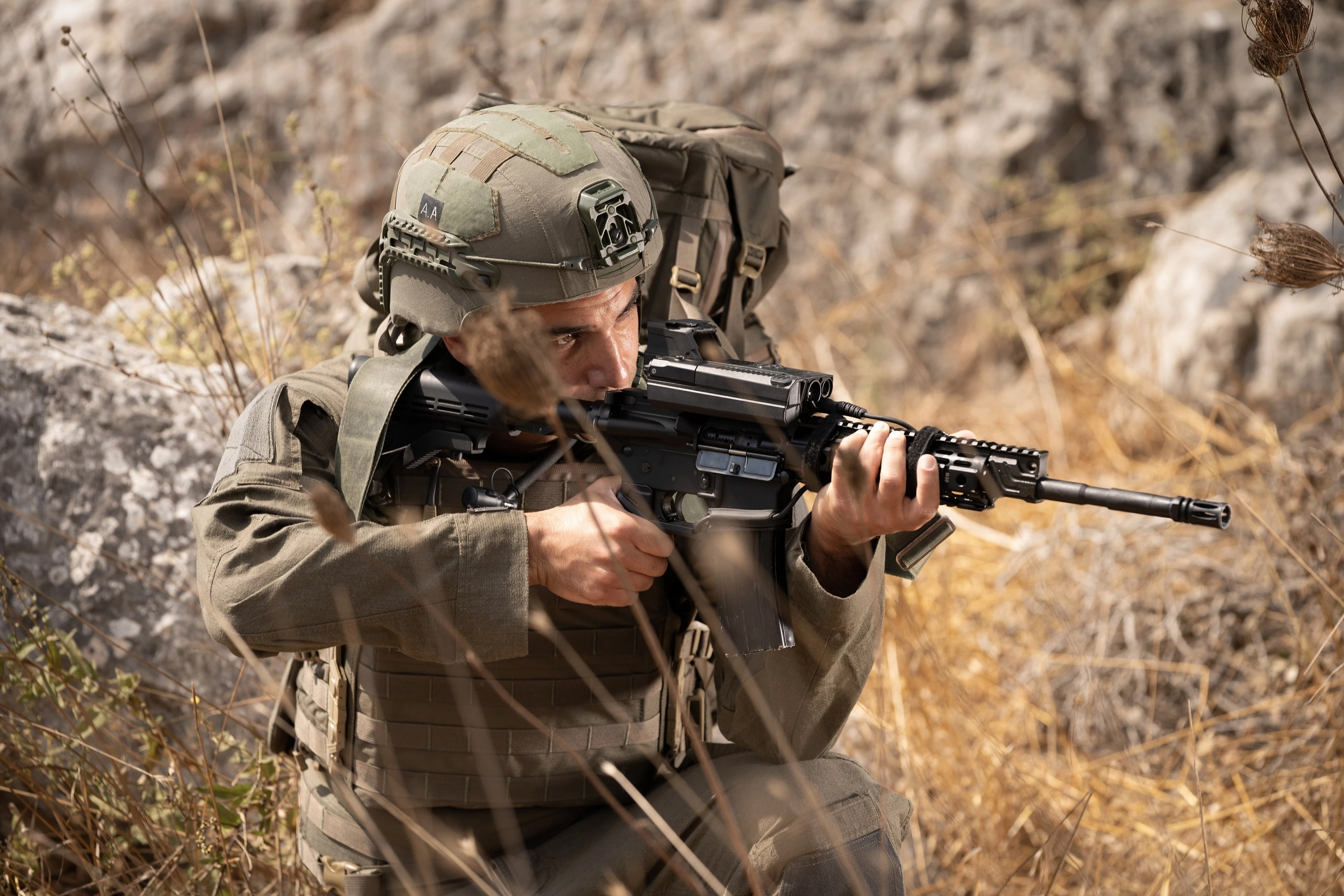
SMASH Handheld on an IDF M4A1 Carbine assault rifle

SMASH is a contraction of the three first letters of "Smart" and two first letters of "Shooter".

When installed on an assault rifle, it uses an advanced artificial intelligence-powered machine vision to assist in aiming shots more precisely. The dual-core computer with ballistic processing can recognize, track, and engage aerial (drone/UAS) and ground targets with precision.

It is currently in use by Israel, The United Kingdom, the United States, India, and other countries. In 2025, The Australian Defence Force selected the SMASH for technology evaluation, with a contract valued at just under $500,000.

The system consists of a digital camera, a display for the shooter, a trigger guard, and a firing computer capable of locking onto a moving target, analyzing its speed, and environmental conditions (distance, wind, humidity), and estimating when and how a bullet fired by the shooter will hit the target with a 95% probability. SMASH locks on the target and tracks its movement to synchronize the shot release. When the computer identifies such a hit probability, it sends a signal to the shooter, marking with a red dot or a red cross on the sight display to allow for accurate aiming. The trigger guard prevents firing when the computer estimates a low chance of hitting the target. The sight's camera also records the shooting, allowing for operational investigation when necessary.

SMASH can also be used in a remote-controlled fire control system.

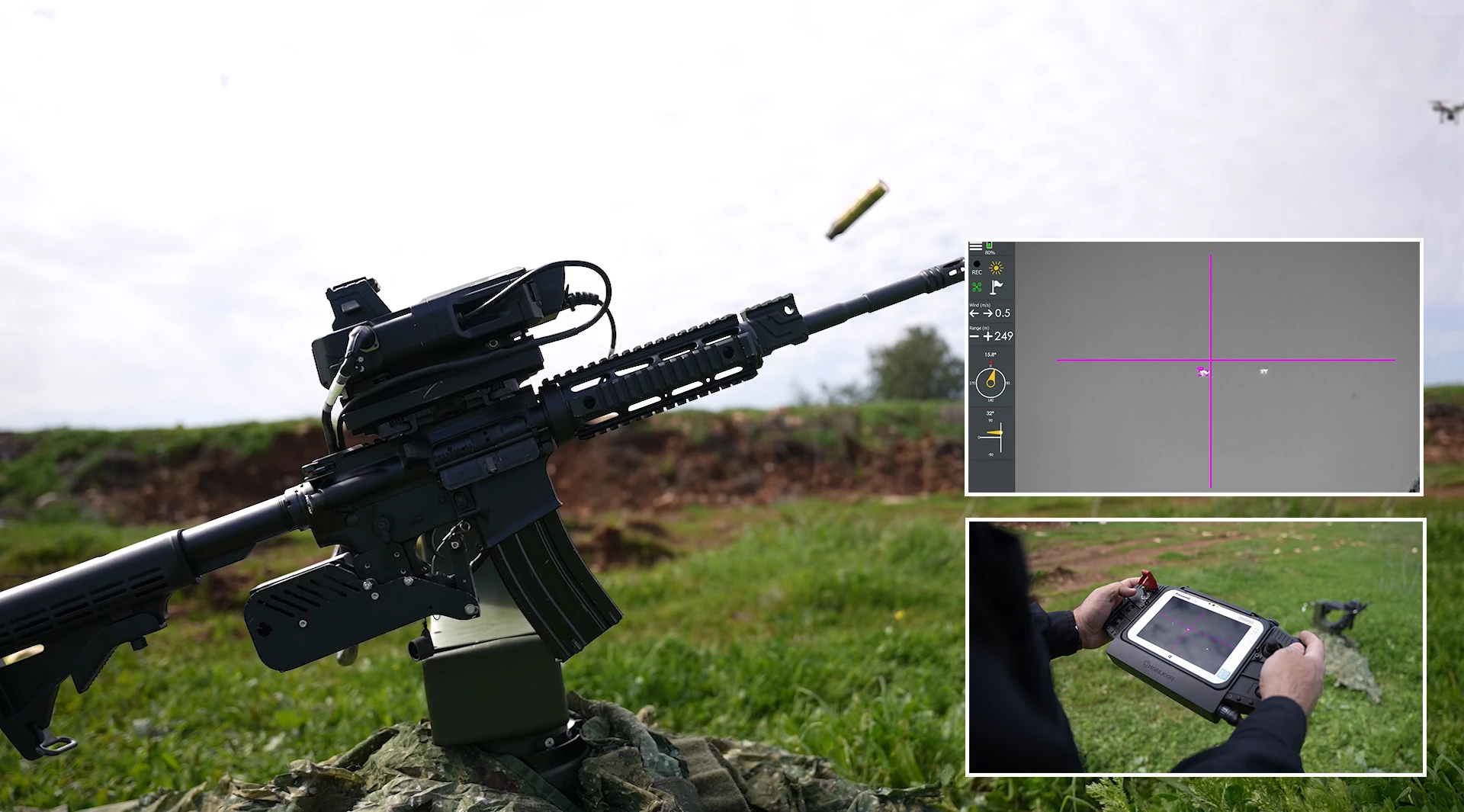
The SMASH remote-controlled

== See also ==
- Aselsan SMASH
