= EXACTO =

Sniper round

EXACTO, an acronym of "Extreme Accuracy Tasked Ordnance", is a sniper rifle firing smart bullets being developed for DARPA (Defense Advanced Research Projects Agency) by Lockheed Martin and Teledyne Scientific & Imaging in November 2008.

The new .50 BMG gun and improved scope could employ "fire-and-forget" technologies including "fin-stabilized projectiles, spin-stabilized projectiles, internal and/or external aero-actuation control methods, projectile guidance technologies, tamper proofing, small stable power supplies, and advanced sighting, optical resolution and clarity technologies". Its estimated availability at the time was 2015.

The DARPA EXACTO program may face competition from Sandia National Laboratories for creating a guided sniper round. The DARPA EXACTO program uses different methods from Sandia's guided round. It relies on remote-guidance tied to the optics, which may be more reliable than Sandia's laser guidance method of painting the target with a laser for their projectile to follow, which can be detected, diffused, or blocked. EXACTO models on existing .50 BMG ammunition and rifles instead of needing new hardware, which the Sandia guided dart would need. Although EXACTO is specifically focused on military applications, Sandia is seeking to make commercial sales of their guided sniper projectile.

DARPA test fired the EXACTO in early 2014 and released video of demonstrations in July 2014. Exact technologies used in the bullets were not revealed, but the EXACTO uses a real-time optical guidance system with no visible fins or other steering mechanism on bullet illustrations. Footage released showed the rifle intentionally aiming off target so the bullets could correct their flight path. EXACTO technology is claimed to markedly extend the day and night-time range of current sniper systems. How the ammunition is designed to change direction in mid-air is classified. The second phase of the program was completed in summer 2014 with a number of improvements provided. The next phase included further refinements and a system-level live-fire test.

The EXACTO program completed another round of live-fire tests in February 2015. In the tests, an experienced shooter used the guided rounds to track and hit a moving target several times. Video showed the bullets maneuvering in-flight to achieve hits. Additionally, an inexperienced shooter used the system and was still able to hit the moving target.

In mid-2016, Russia revealed it was developing a similar "smart bullet" designed to hit targets at a distance of up to 10 kilometres (6.2 mi).

The price for one of these bullets has not been revealed to the public, but DARPA has estimated 10-100 US dollars per round.

== See also ==
- Airburst round
- Barrett XM109
- XM25 CDTE
