= TrackingPoint =

Weapon technology company

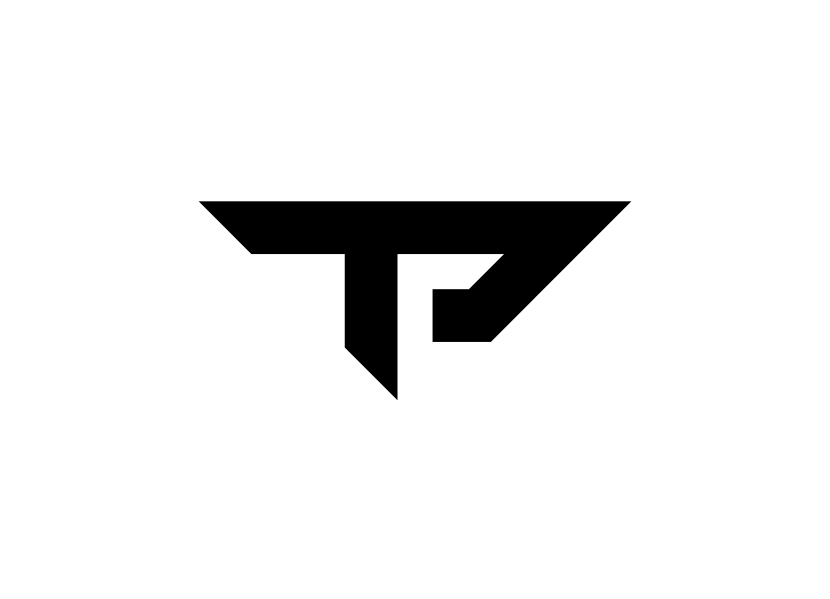
- Type: Private
- Industry: Applied technology
- Founded: 2011
- Founder: John McHale
- Headquarters: Austin, Texas, United States
- Website: tracking-point.com

TrackingPoint is an applied technology company based in Austin, Texas. In 2011, it created a long-range rifle system that was the first precision guided firearm.

Formed by John McHale in February 2011, the company created its first PGF prototype in March 2011. The company offered its first product in January 2013 and a second, the AR Series semi-automatic smart rifle, in January 2014.

Variants of the company's bolt-action rifles use .338 Lapua Magnum and .300 Winchester Magnum ammunition. Semi-automatic variants are available in 7.62 NATO, 5.56 NATO and .300 BLK.

In September 2016, the company began selling the M1400, a squad-level .338 Lapua bolt-action rifle that can hit targets out to 1,400 yards (1,280 m). It can also acquire and hit targets traveling at 20 mph (32 km/h) within 2.5 seconds. The rifle is 45 in (110 cm) long with a 22 in (560 mm) barrel, weighing 15.4 lb (7.0 kg). It can be used with the company's ShotGlass wearable glasses that transmits what the scope is seeing to the shooter's eye.

In January 2014, the U.S. Army purchased six TrackingPoint fire control systems to begin exploring purported key target acquisition and aiming technologies. The Army has integrated the system onto the XM2010 Enhanced Sniper Rifle for military testing.

In 2018, TrackingPoint introduced the ShadowTrak 6 bolt-action rifle with 6.5 mm Creedmoor cartridge that can hit targets out to 1,000 yards (914 m), and can hit targets traveling at 20 mph (32 km/h) in 1 second. Weighing 14.6 lb (6.6 kg), it can fire Hornady ammunition; the 147gr ELD-M (a match type bullet) or the 143gr ELD-X (designed for hunting).

In November 2018, Talon Precision Optics, of Jacksonville, Florida, bought TrackingPoint.

== Technology ==
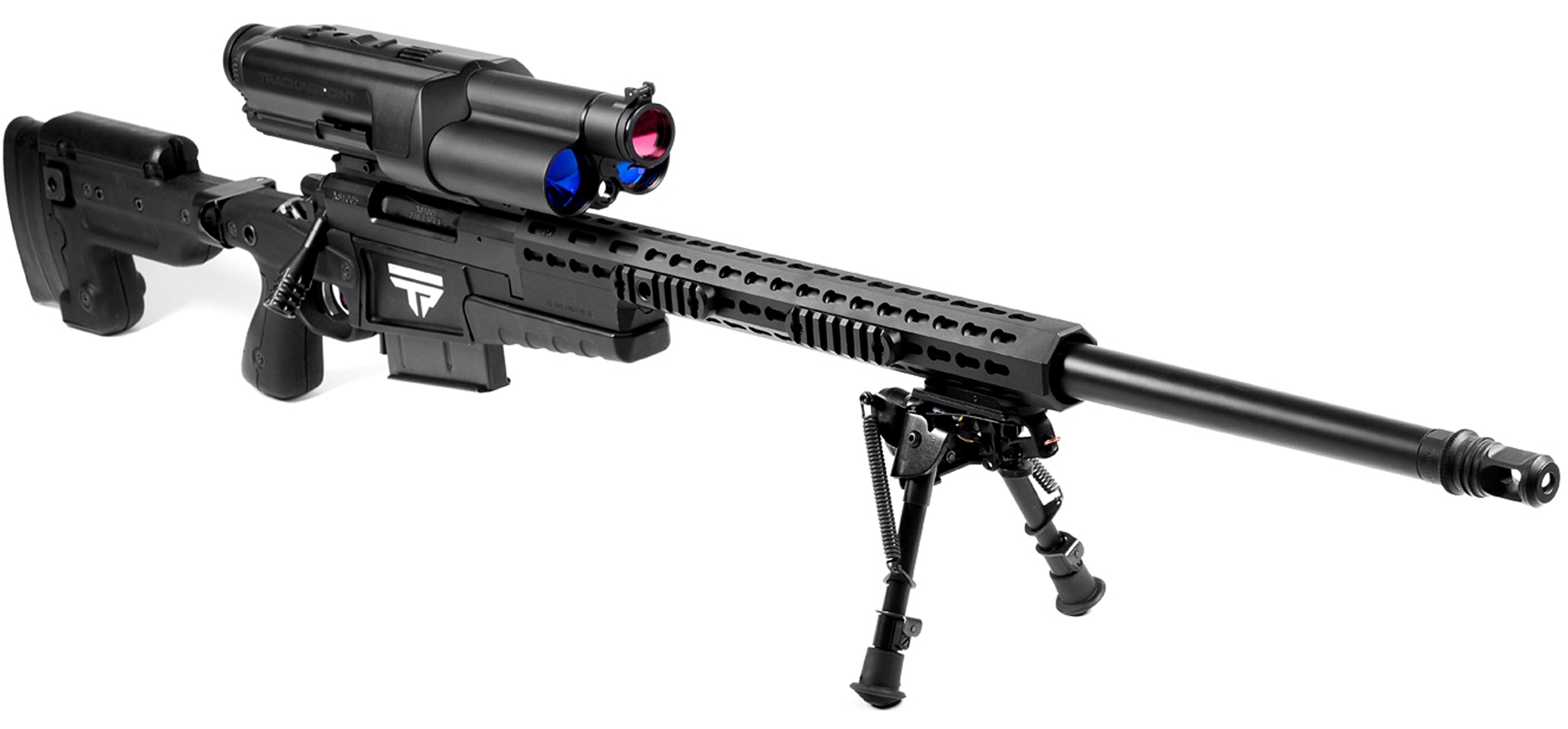
The TrackingPoint XS1, a precision guided firearm

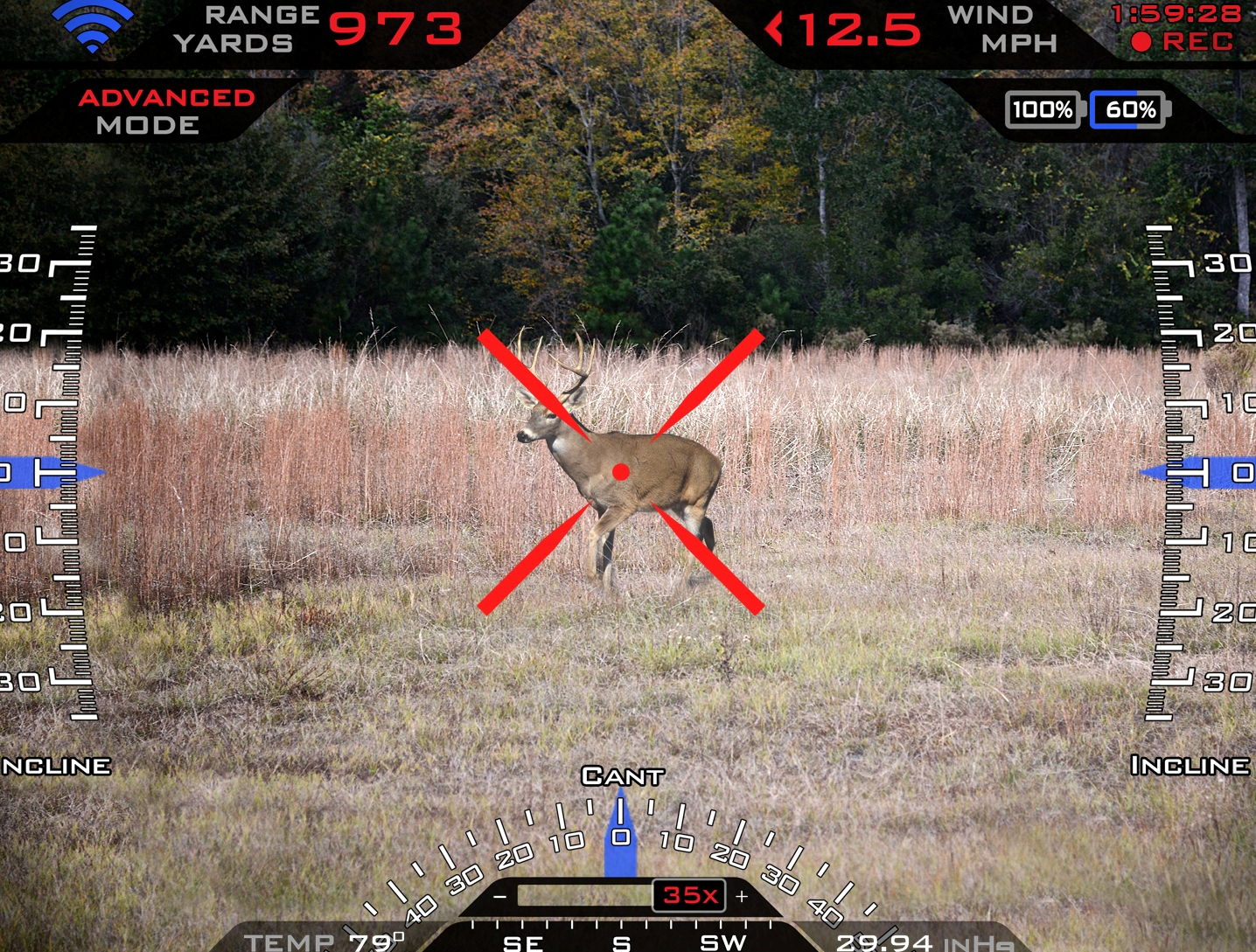
Screenshot from the heads up display of a TrackingPoint precision guided firearm

TrackingPoint's precision guided firearms system uses several component technologies:

- Networked Tracking Scope: The core engine that tracks the target, calculates range and the ballistic solution, and works in concert with the shooter and guided trigger to release the shot.
- Barrel Reference System: A fixed reference point that enables the networked tracking scope to make adjustments and retain zero over time. The barrel reference system is factory calibrated to a laser reference.
- Guided to Trigger: The rifle's trigger is hard-wired to the networked tracking scope. The networked tracking scope controls the trigger weight to eliminate trigger squeeze and shot timing errors.
- Field Software Upgradeable: Software can be uploaded to the scope to add capability.
- Heads Up Display (HUD): The HUD indicates range, wind, reticle, video storage gauge, zoom, and battery life, plus LRF icon, Wi-Fi on/off icon, compass icon, cant wheel, inclination wheels and off-screen indicators.
- Recording: An integrated camera captures video and still images from the networked tracking scope and heads up display. Recorded images can be downloaded to a smartphone or tablet from the scope and transmitted via email or social media.

== Vulnerabilities ==
In 2017, computer security experts Runa Sandvik and Michael Auger demonstrated that naive software design left the rifle's aiming computer open to remote hacking when its Wi-Fi capability was turned on. They showed that third parties could alter operating parameters; for example, making the computer think the bullet weighed from 0.4 ounces (11 g) to 72 pounds (33 kg), which would make the rifle fire inaccurately. A skilled hacker could acquire root access and brick the computer.
