= Eila =

Eila may refer to:

- Eila Campbell (1915–1994), English geographer and cartographer
- Eila Hiltunen (1922–2003), Finnish sculptor
- Eila Ilmatar Juutilainen, a character from the Strike Witches anime
- Eila Kivikk'aho (1921–2004), Finnish poet
- Eila Pellinen (1938–1977), Finnish singer
- Eila Roine (1931–2025), Finnish actress
- Eila C. Skinner, American urologic oncologist and surgeon
- Eila (film), a 2003 Finnish film
