= Jian-Min Yuan =

Jian-Min Yuan may refer to:

- Jian-Min Yuan (epidemiologist), Chinese cancer epidemiologist
- Jian-Min Yuan (physicist) (born 1944), Taiwanese physicist
