= Caryn Lerman =

American psychologist

- Lerman in 2013

Academic background
- Education: BSc, psychology, 1981, University of Pennsylvania; MSc, 1982, PhD, 1984, University of Southern California

Academic work
- Institutions: USC Norris Comprehensive Cancer Center; University of Pennsylvania; Georgetown Lombardi Comprehensive Cancer Center

Caryn E. Lerman is an American psychologist. She is the director of the USC Norris Comprehensive Cancer Center through the Keck School of Medicine.

== Early life and education ==
Lerman completed her Bachelor of Science degree in psychology from Pennsylvania State University in 1981 before moving to California and enrolling in the University of Southern California for her Master's degree and PhD.

== Career ==
Following her PhD, Lerman joined the Georgetown Lombardi Comprehensive Cancer Center as a professor of oncology, psychiatry, and pharmacology and associate director for Cancer Control and Population Science. She left Georgetown in 2001 to become the Associate Director for Cancer Control and Population Science at the Penn Cancer Center and Director of the Tobacco Research Program at the Leonard & Madlyn Abramson Family Cancer Research Institute. While serving in this role, Lerman studied the genetic influences on tobacco use and their implications for developing successful smoking prevention and treatment programs. In 2003, she was named the inaugural Mary W. Calkins Chair at the Annenberg Public Policy Center.

In 2006, Lerman was appointed the Abramson Cancer Center’s deputy director where she led the Abramson Cancer Center’s Strategic Planning Committee. As a result, she was promoted to interim director of the Cancer Center in October 2010. During this same time, Lerman was elected a member of the National Academy of Medicine (then referred to as the Institute of Medicine). In 2013, Lerman and colleague Robert Hornik received a federal grant to create the University of Pennsylvania's Tobacco Center of Regulatory Science. The aim of the center was designed to conduct studies to inform the regulation of tobacco products to protect public health.

During her tenure at UPenn, Lerman continued to focus on the interface between neuroscience and cancer prevention. She explored how the brain’s cognitive control system could be enhanced to override behavioral habits that contribute to obesity and cancer risks. While directing the Tobacco Center, Lerman received the 2015 NCI Outstanding Investigator Award. Within two years, Lerman was named the John H. Glick, MD Professor in Cancer Research and served as a member of the National Advisory Council for Human Genome Research, the National Cancer Institute Board of Scientific Advisors, and the National Institute on Drug Abuse Advisory Council.

In 2019 Lerman eventually retired UPenn to join the Keck Hospital of USC as the new director of the USC Norris Comprehensive Cancer Center. While there, she was elected President of the Association of American Cancer Institutes. Lerman was named a Top Women Leader in Health by the Los Angeles Business Journal.
