= Francine Ratner Kaufman =

American endocrinologist

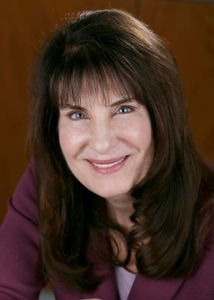
- Education: Chicago Medical School (MD, 1976)
- Occupation: Physician
- Known for: Diabetes

Francine Ratner Kaufman is an American endocrinologist, professor, author, researcher, consultant, and corporate officer in the medical field of diabetes mellitus. She is the author of Diabesity: The Obesity-Diabetes Epidemic That Threatens America. She is chief medical officer for Senseonics, Inc.

== Professional overview ==
Kaufman previously was president of the American Diabetes Association and chaired the National Diabetes Education Program. She is vice president of Global Medical Affairs, for the Diabetes business of Medtronic Inc. and past director of the Comprehensive Childhood Diabetes Center, and head of the Center for Endocrinology, Diabetes and Metabolism at Children's Hospital Los Angeles. She was elected as a member of the Institute of Medicine of the National Academies in 2005.

Kaufman is professor of pediatrics at the Keck School of Medicine of the University of Southern California and received a Distinguished Professor award from USC in 2006. Kaufman was also an attending physician at Children's Hospital Los Angeles. She is a diplomate of the American Board of Pediatrics and is board-certified in pediatric endocrinology and metabolism.

Kaufman's board certifications include the National Board of Medical Examiners, 1977; Diplomat, American Board of Pediatrics, 1981; and Pediatric Endocrine and Metabolism, 1983.

== Educational overview ==
- Degrees: Chicago Medical School, MD, 1976; Northwestern University, BA,
- Internships: Children's Hospital of Los Angeles, 1976–1977
- Residencies: Children's Hospital of Los Angeles, 1977–1978
- Fellowships: Children's Hospital of Los Angeles, 1978–1980

== Personal overview ==
Francine Kaufman is married to pediatrician Neal Kaufman. They reside in Brentwood, CA and have two sons, Adam and Jonah.

== Research ==
Kaufman's research interests include type 1 diabetes mellitus, type 2 diabetes, galactosemia, bone mineralization, ambiguous genitalia, patterns of growth hormone secretion and growth failure, androgen metabolism in human skin, endocrine manifestations of childhood AIDS, optic nerve hypoplasia/Septo-optic dysplasia and hypopituitarism and homocysteine metabolism.

== Awards ==
Among other awards, Kaufman received the 2006 Mathies Award for Vision & Excellence in Healthcare Leadership; the Woman of Valor for 2003 by the American Diabetes Association in recognition of her outstanding dedication and commitment to diabetes.
