= Lee Rogers (podiatrist) =

American podiatrist (born 1978)

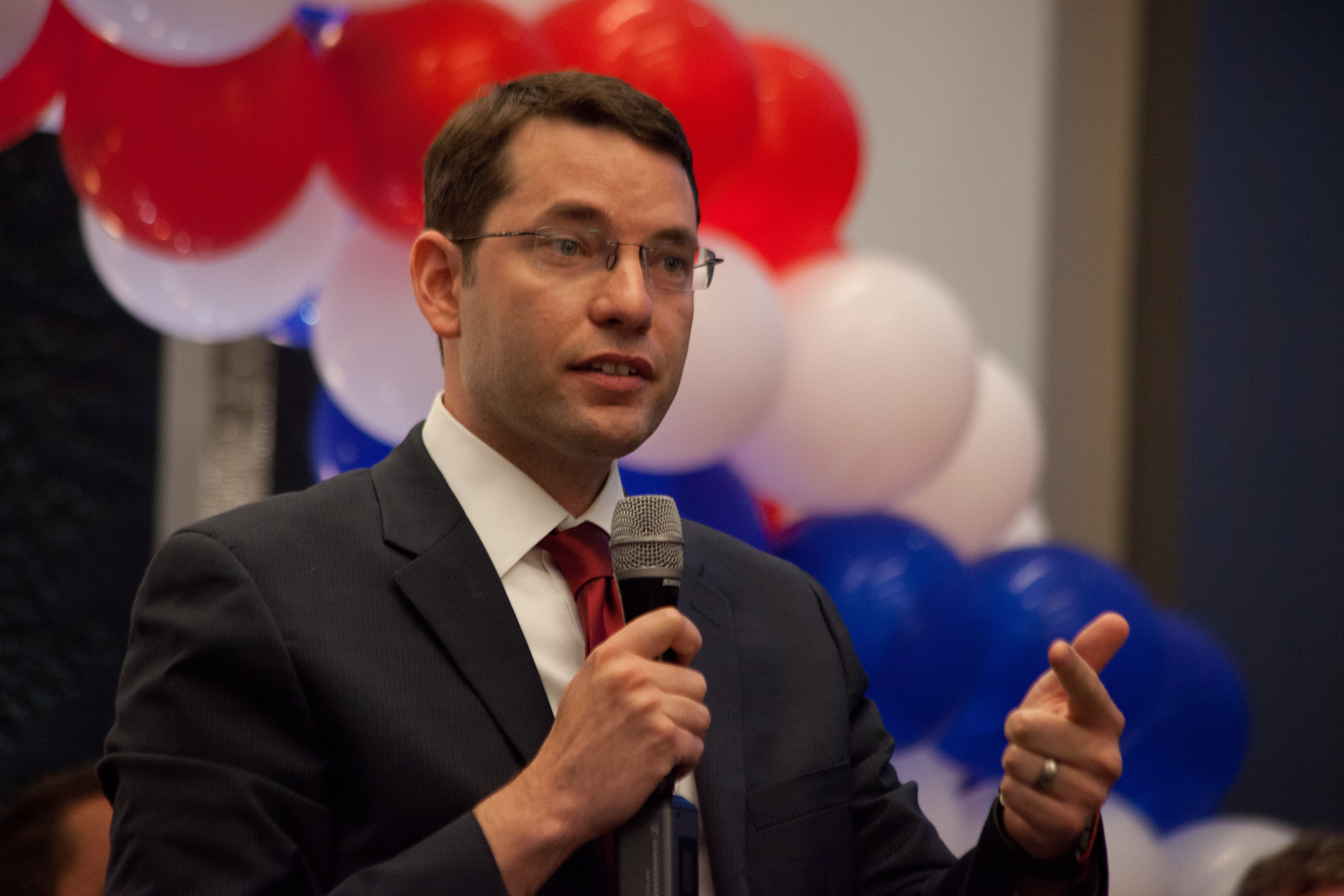
- Born: February 27, 1978 (age 48); Elgin, Illinois, United States
- Education: Truman State University; Des Moines University
- Occupation: Podiatrist
- Children: 2

Lee Christopher Rogers (born February 27, 1978) is an American podiatrist from San Antonio, Texas. He is most known for his work preventing amputations in diabetes and treating Charcot foot and he has helped define the qualifications of doctors of podiatric medicine and the privileging process for hospitals and surgery. He is the vice president of the International Federation of Podiatrists and he served as the president of the American Board of Podiatric Medicine (2021-2023). He was the Democratic nominee for US Congress in California's 25th district in 2012, and lost in California's top-two primary in June 2014. Rogers is also known as a film producer.

== Early life and education ==
Rogers was born in Elgin, Illinois to George Robert and Madelynn Jean Rogers and moved to Gallatin, Missouri at a young age. He attended primary and secondary school in Gallatin. e was awarded the Congress Bundestag Youth Exchange scholarship and spent his senior year in Uetersen, Germany.

Rogers attended Truman State University in Kirksville, Missouri from 1996 to 2000. He graduated with a Doctor of Podiatric Medicine (DPM) from Des Moines University College of Podiatric Medicine in 2004 where he was president of the student body. He completed a residency in podiatric medicine and surgery at Saint Vincent's Catholic Medical Center in New York, New York and then later a fellowship in limb salvage and research with David G. Armstrong at Rosalind Franklin University of Medicine and Science in North Chicago, Illinois.

== Career ==
=== Des Moines, Iowa ===
Following his fellowship, Rogers founded and directed the Amputation Prevention Center at Broadlawns Medical Center in Des Moines, Iowa. While in Iowa, Rogers described the six steps to preventing amputations and published a reduction in major amputations by 72%. Rogers won first place for outstanding research from the American Podiatric Medical Association (APMA) in 2007 for mesenchymal stem cell research on wounds and 2009 for hi-tech wound measurement techniques. He proposed simple measures to reduce costs of amputations in the healthcare system.

=== Los Angeles, California ===
Rogers was recruited to Valley Presbyterian Hospital in Los Angeles in 2009 to co-create the Amputation Prevention Center. In December 2013, Rogers became the executive medical director of the Amputation Prevention Center at Sherman Oaks Hospital. He created a unique inpatient and outpatient facility which greatly improved upon existing limb salvage and wound healing rates by using a team approach with the most modern tools and techniques. In 2014, a medical director of Valley Presbyterian Hospital claimed that Rogers was fired as medical director, which Rogers disputed and he later sued the hospital for breach of contract which led to an undisclosed monetary settlement to Rogers. He founded the Amputation Prevention Centers of America, while medical director of Paradigm Medical Management, a trademark now owned by RestorixHealth, Inc, where he currently serves as medical director. Rogers served as co-director of the Diabetic Foot Conference (DFCon) from 2010 to 2013.

=== San Antonio, Texas ===
Rogers became Chief of Podiatry at the University of Texas Health Science Center at San Antonio (UTHSCSA) in 2021. He directs clinical services for podiatric medicine and surgery at UTHSCSA, University Hospital, and the Texas Diabetes Institute. Rogers oversees the educational programs which trains students, residents, and fellows. The podiatry residency program is one of the oldest in the United States and celebrated its 50th year in 2023. He co-founded the Great Debates & Updates Diabetic Foot conference in 2022 with frequent collaborator Lawrence A. Lavery, DPM, MPH.

=== Academic work and recognition ===
Rogers is an Associate Professor of Orthopaedics at UTHSCSA. He also holds the endowed Louis T. Bogy, DPM Professorship in Podiatric Medicine and Surgery. He has authored more than 150 published articles, books, or book chapters on the lower extremity complications of diabetes, their costs, and health policy. He has delivered more than 500 speeches and his work has brought him to all 50 states and more than 30 countries.

In 2009, he became Chair of the Foot Care Council of the American Diabetes Association and his most noted accomplishment was the creation of consensus guidelines for the treatment of Charcot foot which took place at the Pitié-Salpêtrière Hospital in Paris, France. The guidelines were jointly published in the Journal of the American Podiatric Medical Association and Diabetes Care and is the most frequently referenced paper on the syndrome. He received the Rising Star Award from the APMA in 2011 for outstanding national accomplishments. In 2013, he received the Master's Award from the American Professional Wound Care Association. Rogers has been named by Podiatry Management Magazine as One of America's Most Influential Podiatrists in each issue since 2017. He was one of a small group of American podiatrists selected as a Fellow of the Faculty of Podiatric Medicine in the Royal College of Physicians and Surgeons in Glasgow, Scotland, in 2017.

Rogers served on the board of directors of the American Board of Podiatric Medicine and became its president in 2021. He founded the board's now-defunct Certificate of Added Qualification (CAQ) program in 2017. Rogers founded the American Board of Podiatric Medicine - International in 2019, which is the first board exam offered to podiatrists outside the United States. He has been an advocate of establishing a single certifying board and single tier of certification within American podiatry.

Rogers has been instrumental in defining the role of podiatrists on the healthcare team and within health systems. He co-authored the Toe-Flow Team Guidelines and the Global Vascular Guidelines published in the Journal of Vascular Surgery. He also authored privileging guidelines for podiatrists working in hospitals, supervising hyperbaric oxygen treatment, and the ABPM's position statement on hospital and surgical privileges for podiatrists. Early during the COVID-19 pandemic, he warned of the negative effect on people with diabetes and foot wounds and later wrote about the "pandemic within a pandemic" which reported on the increased lower-extremity amputation rate. His other notable works include the Diabetic Foot Ulcer Guidelines from the Wound Healing Society and a co-author of the Global Vascular Guidelines published in vascular journals around the world.

Rogers or his work has been quoted in the Wall Street Journal, U.S. News & World Report, the Washington Post, CBS News, and many medical specialty magazines.

=== Political endeavors ===
Rogers, a Democrat, ran for US Congress in California's 25th district. He lost by 9% of the vote after giving incumbent Congressman Buck McKeon a strong challenge. Rogers appointed the first-ever high school student to be a member of the Electoral College in 2012.

After speculation that Congressman Buck McKeon will retire in 2014, Rogers announced his candidacy for the seat again and received the endorsement of the Los Angeles Times. Two Republicans edged out Rogers in California's new top two primary for the run off in the June 2014 election. Rogers endorsed Republican Steve Knight over Republican Tony Strickland which drew criticism from the Democratic Party, but Rogers stated, "I didn’t create the rules and I care too much about our district to let it fall to a dishonest carpetbagger who is interested only in himself, like Tony Strickland." He later withdrew his endorsement of Knight over his refusal to ban the sale of the Confederate Flag in the California Capital.

He has been highly critical of the American healthcare system and the pharmaceutical industry for their focus on profits over patient care.

=== Filmography ===
In 2015, Rogers became a producer of films after one of his patients, Stephen Furst, introduced him to the industry. He had a cameo role in some of the films he has produced.

- Atomic Shark (SyFy 2016), Producer, cameo as parasailer 1
- Cold Moon (Theatrical Release 2017), Producer, cameo as the coroner
- Trailer Park Shark (SyFy 2017), Producer
- Nightmare Shark (SyFy 2018), Producer
