= Scientific Sessions =

Scientific Sessions is the name of several medical conferences and publications.

- American Diabetes Association, annual research meeting
- American Heart Association, annual research meeting
- Diabetes Care, special supplement to cover the ADA's annual research meeting
