= Amytis =

Amitis or Amytis may refer to:

- Amytis of Media (c. 630–565 BCE), daughter of Cyaxares and wife of Nebuchadnezzar
- Amytis (daughter of Astyages) (6th century BCE), daughter of Astyages and wife of Cyrus II
- Amytis (daughter of Xerxes I) (5th century BCE), daughter of Xerxes I
- Amytis Towfighi, American neurologist and professor
- 5560 Amytis, a minor planet
