= Tracy Brown (disambiguation) =

Tracy Brown (born 1974) is an American author.

Tracy or Tracey Brown may also refer to:

- Tracey Brown (born 1967), Canadian country music artist
- Tracey Brown (scientist), director of a UK charity
- Tracey D. Brown, American businesswoman
- Tracy Brown-May (born 1967), American politician

== See also ==
- Tracey Browning (born 1963), Australian basketball player
- Tracy Y. Browning (born 1976), counselor of the Church of Jesus Christ of Latter-day Saints
