= Cailliet =

Cailliet is a surname. Notable people with the surname include:

- Gregor Cailliet, American scientist
- Lucien Cailliet (1891–1985), French-American composer, conductor, arranger and clarinetist
- Rene Cailliet (1917–2015), American physician
