= Mariana C. Stern =

Argentine cancer epidemiologist (born 1967)

- Born: April 15, 1967 (age 59); Buenos Aires, Argentina
- Education: University of Buenos Aires; University of Texas MD Anderson Cancer Center
- Scientific career
- Fields: Cancer epidemiology, health equity
- Workplaces: University of Southern California
- Doctoral advisor: Claudio J. Conti

Mariana Carla Stern (born April 15, 1967) is an Argentine cancer epidemiologist who researches environmental, dietary, and genetic factors that influence cancer risk, with an emphasis on health disparities in minority populations. She is the Ira Goodman chair in cancer research and a professor of population and public health sciences and urology at the University of Southern California (USC). Stern is also the associate director for population sciences at the USC Norris Comprehensive Cancer Center.

== Education ==
Stern was born on April 15, 1967 in Buenos Aires, Argentina. She completed her B.S. (1992) and M.S. in biology at the University of Buenos Aires, School of Science. She obtained a Ph.D. in cancer biology from The University of Texas MD Anderson Cancer Center UTHealth Houston Graduate School of Biomedical Sciences in 1997. Her dissertation was titled, Genetic Analysis of Tumor Progression Susceptibility in the Mouse Skin Model. Stern's research identified a dominant gene on chromosome 14 that influences tumor progression in mouse skin carcinogenesis, with findings showing increased proliferation, genomic instability, and overexpression of key proteins in susceptible strains. Claudio J. Conti was her supervisory professor during her doctoral research. Stern undertook postdoctoral training in epidemiology at the National Institute of Environmental Health Sciences from 1997 to 2001.

== Career ==
In 2001 Stern began her academic career as a faculty member in the department of preventive medicine at the Keck School of Medicine of USC at the University of Southern California (USC). Her early work focused on cancer epidemiology, and she developed an interest in understanding cancer disparities among minority populations. Trained in cancer biology and population sciences, she explores the environmental and genetic risk factors for cancer, with a particular emphasis on dietary exposures and their potential role in cancer risk.

In 2016, Stern expanded her role at USC by joining the department of urology, bridging preventive medicine and clinical research. Her research includes clinical epidemiological studies that address disparities in cancer outcomes for minority groups, especially among Latino and Black populations. She collaborates extensively with the Los Angeles Cancer Surveillance Program to examine cancer patterns in these communities.

Stern is the associate director for population sciences at the USC Norris Comprehensive Cancer Center (NCCC) and serves as the Ira Goodman Chair in Cancer Research. Stern plays a role in national initiatives aimed at improving cancer research and health equity. She is the co-director and co-principal investigator for the Florida-California Cancer Research, Education, and Engagement (CaRE2) Health Equity Center. This program, funded by the National Cancer Institute (NCI), fosters partnerships between USC, the University of Florida, and Florida A&M University to address cancer disparities.

Stern is a member of the American Association for Cancer Research (AACR), where she serves on the minorities in cancer research council. Her publications cover a wide range of topics in cancer epidemiology, including the role of diet in cancer risk, genetic risk factors, and prostate and colorectal cancer disparities. Stern mentors the next generation of minority researchers, particularly through her involvement in education and training programs like CaRE2's summer cancer research education and training program.
