= Susan Cotter =

American optometrist

Susan A. Cotter is a professor of optometry at the Southern California College of Optometry (SCCO) at Marshall B. Ketchum University where she teaches in the classroom and clinic, works with the residents, and conducts clinical researches. Her scientific work is related to related to clinical management strategies for strabismus, amblyopia, non-strabismic binocular vision disorders, and childhood refractive error.

== Education ==
Cotter holds an undergraduate degree from Loyola University Chicago. She obtained a doctor of optometry (O.D.) degree from the Illinois College of Optometry in 1983. She completed a residency in children's vision at the Marshall B. Ketchum University's Southern California College of Optometry. In 2006, she earned a master's degree in clinical and biomedical investigations from the Keck School of Medicine.

== Career ==
Cotter is a professor at Marshall B. Ketchum University and is a vice-chair at both the Pediatric Eye Disease Investigator Group, a division of National Eye Institute, and the Convergence Insufficiency Treatment Trial. She also serves on the National Expert Panel of the American Optometric Association. She serves on the board of directors of the American Academy of Optometry. Cotter is a fellow of the College of Optometrists in Vision Development and a recipient of an Ezell fellowship from the American Optometric Foundation.

She has also worked on a leading positions for such NEI-funded studies as the Multi-Ethnic Pediatric Eye Disease Study (MEPEDS), the Collaborative Longitudinal Evaluation of Refractive Error (CLEERE), the Convergence Insufficiency Treatment Trial (CITT), and the CITT-Attention & Reading Trial (CITT-ART).

Cotter works on the board of directors of the American Academy of Optometry, where she is a diplomate and past chair of the Binocular Vision, Perception, and Pediatric Optometry Section, and a past editorial board member for the academy's journal, Optometry and Vision Science.

She is working as a vice chair on a NEI-funded research trial, which is called Convergence Insufficiency Treatment Trial – Attention & Reading Trial, where she tries to engage optometrists around the country to study the effects and success rate of vision therapy for children with convergence insufficiency.

== Professional associations ==
- American Academy of Optometry: board of directors, diplomate, past chair of the Binocular Vision, Perception, & Pediatric Optometry Section
- American Optometry Association: Council on Research
- National Center for Children's Vision and Eye Health: National Expert Panel
- Pediatric Eye Disease Investigator Group (PEDIG): vice chair
- Editor of the textbook Clinical Applications of Prisms
