= Joshua Ritchie =

Joshua Ritchie may refer to:

- Joshua H. Ritchie (born 1938), American-Israeli Rabbi and doctor
- Josh Ritchie, British reality-TV personality
