= Journal of Health Communication =

Academic journal

- Discipline: Health communication
- Language: English
- Edited by: Scott C. Ratzan

Publication details
- History: 1996–present
- Publisher: Taylor & Francis
- Frequency: Monthly
- Impact factor: 2.9 (2025)

Standard abbreviations
- ISO 4: J. Health Commun.

Indexing
- CODEN: JHCOF3
- ISSN: 1081-0730 (print); 1087-0415 (web)
- LCCN: 96660048
- OCLC no.: 900961350

Links
- Journal homepage; Online access; Online archive

The Journal of Health Communication is a monthly peer-reviewed scientific journal covering health communication.

== History and Scope ==
The Journal of Health Communication is a monthly peer-reviewed academic journal covering the field of health communication. It was established in 1996 and is published by Taylor & Francis. The journal publishes original research, theoretical contributions, and practical case studies that explore how communication processes influence health outcomes across interpersonal, organizational, mass media, and digital platforms. The journal takes editorial positions on issues in the field such as vaccine confidence, quality health information, interpersonal and mass media communication, decision making, and health literacy.

== Editorial Leadership ==
The editor-in-chief is Scott C. Ratzan, a distinguished lecturer at CUNY Graduate School of Public Health and Health Policy. The managing editor is Lauren Swan-Potras, also based at CUNY. The journal is supported by a team of Senior Editors representing international institutions:

- Gert-Jan de Bruin (University of Antwerp, Belgium)
- Rebecca K. Ivic (University of Alabama, United States)
- Parul Jain (Ohio University, United States)
- Hyekyung Kim (Nanyang Technological University, Singapore)
- Lourdes Martinez (San Diego State University, United States)
- Sara Rubinelli (University of Lucerne, Switzerland)
- Heidi Vandebosch (University of Antwerp, Belgium)

Additional editorial roles include:

- Special Projects Editor: Kenneth Rabin (CUNY Graduate School of Public Health and Health Policy, USA)
- Senior Editor for Health Literacy & the Arts: Ruth Parker (Emory University, USA)
- Exchange Editor: Marcia Zorn

== Abstracting, Indexing, and Impact ==
The Journal of Health Communication is indexed in major databases, including PubMed, Scopus, and Web of Science. The journal has an impact factor of 4.4 with over 417,000 annual downloads according to Journal Citation Reports.
