= Don Harper Mills =

American pathologist and medical-legal scholar (1927–2013)

- Born: July 29, 1927
- Died: May 21, 2013 (aged 85)
- Education: University of Cincinnati; University of Southern California
- Medical career
- Field: Forensic science Legal medicine Pathology
- Institutions: Keck School of Medicine

Don Harper Mills (July 29, 1927 – May 21, 2013) was an American pathologist and medical-legal scholar. He was a clinical professor of pathology and psychiatry at the Keck School of Medicine at the University of Southern California, president of the American College of Legal Medicine from 1974 to 1976, and a Distinguished Fellow of the American Academy of Forensic Sciences, of which he served as president from 1986 to 1987. He was also a practicing lawyer who served as medical director of the County of Los Angeles Medical Malpractice Program. He is known for telling the "Ronald Opus" story to members of the American Academy of Forensic Sciences in 1987, when he was the Academy's president. Though Mills had invented the story, it has often been incorrectly referred to as if it were true.
