= USC Keck School of Medicine =

Private medical school in Los Angeles, California

Coordinates: 34.061285°N 118.205497°W

- Type: Private
- Established: 1885
- Parent institution: University of Southern California
- Dean: Carolyn C. Meltzer
- Faculty: 1300
- Students: 1262
- Location: Los Angeles, California, United States
- Campus: Urban
- Website: keck.usc.edu

The USC Keck School of Medicine is the medical school of the University of Southern California. The school teaches and trains physicians, biomedical scientists and other healthcare professionals, conducts medical research, and treats patients. Founded in 1885, it is the second oldest medical school in California after the UCSF School of Medicine.

It is located on the university's health sciences campus in northeastern Los Angeles which is adjacent to the neighborhoods of Boyle Heights and Lincoln Heights. For the physician class of 2024, the average GPA was 3.8 and the average MCAT score was 517. In 2023, U.S. News & World Report ranked the school #28 in Best Medical Schools: Research, and tied for #52 in Best Medical Schools: Primary Care.

== Programs ==
In addition to a medical degree (MD), the school offers various combined degrees, such as MD/MPH, MD/PhD and MD/MBA. The school offers separate master's degree program through its Department of Population and Public Health Sciences, including Master of Public Health (MPH) and Master of Science in Global Medicine (MS). The school also offers doctoral degree programs in various biomedical fields, as well as programs in physician assistantship and nurse anesthesia.

The joint MD-PhD program is part of a cooperation with the California Institute of Technology located in nearby Pasadena.

USC also offers a combined engineering and medicine graduate certificate program, available to both PhD and MD students.

== Affiliated hospitals ==
=== Teaching hospitals ===
There are several teaching hospitals, including Los Angeles General Medical Center, a Level I trauma center located in Los Angeles jointly operated by USC and the Los Angeles County Department of Health Services. Keck Hospital of USC, and Children's Hospital of Los Angeles are also teaching hospitals.

=== Keck Medicine of USC ===
Keck Medicine of USC is an affiliated system of hospitals, clinics, and primary care providers and as of 2022, USC Health includes four hospitals, some campus-based specialty clinics, five community-based ambulatory care clinics, and USC Care Medical Group, which is the physician practice of doctors who are on the faculty of the Keck School of Medicine. Hospitals and clinics include the Keck Hospital of USC and the USC Norris Comprehensive Cancer Center, which USC acquired from Tenet Healthcare in 2009 for $275 million after three years of litigation between the parties, Children's Hospital Los Angeles, and the USC Verdugo Hills Hospital in Glendale added in 2013. USC Arcadia Hospital added in 2022 previously known as Methodist Hospital in Arcadia.

== History ==
The school was founded in 1885, and is the oldest medical school in Southern California.

The school's association with Children's Hospital Los Angeles began in 1932. In 1970, it formed the first academic Department of Emergency Medicine in the United States.

By 1983, the USC Norris Comprehensive Cancer Center was opened. Robert E. Tranquada was dean from 1986 to 1991. In 1991, the USC University Hospital, later to be renamed Keck Hospital of USC, was opened.

In July 1999, the W. M. Keck Foundation donated $110 million to the USC School of Medicine. The school was then renamed the Keck School of Medicine of the University of Southern California. The school committed to raising $330 million in matching funds, and used a large portion of the gift to expand research efforts, including the Zilkha Neurogenetic Institute.

In 2015, Paul Aisen, who leads the US Alzheimer's Disease Cooperative Study (ADCS) and its approximately $100 million in funding, left University of California San Diego and joined the faculty of Keck. Aisen had been recruited to UCSD from Georgetown in 2007 to run the ADCS which UCSD had established in 1991. Aisen left UCSD because he was unhappy with the level of support that UCSD was providing him and due to the offer from USC. UCSD and USC ended up in litigation over control of the program. USC rented space for Aisen in a San Diego office park, where Keck's Alzheimer's Therapeutic Research Institute is located under Aisen's direction. Some aspects of data management were temporarily settled in 2016; as of 2017 the litigation was ongoing.

A report in Nature noted that Keck had been recruiting from San Diego, hiring four scientists from Scripps Research Institute after a proposed merger fell through, and that Keck had recruited the director of the UCSD Health System to run its Children's Hospital.

In March 2016 Carmen Puliafito resigned as dean and Rohit Varma became the interim dean, and was named dean in November of that year. On May 1, 2018, Laura Mosqueda was appointed as dean of the school. She is a professor of Family Medicine and Geriatrics. In November 2021, Carolyn C. Meltzer, a neuroradiologist and nuclear medicine doctor, was named as the new dean of the school effective March 1, 2022.

== Medical Education ==
The Keck School of Medicine medical education program consists of 3 phases: Scientific and Clinical Foundations, Clinical Immersion, and Individuation and Transformation.

The Phase 1 of the curriculum includes 3 semesters of pre-clerkship education. The pre-clerkship phase consists of several longitudinal courses, including Health Justice and Systems of Care (HJSC), Introduction to Clinical Medicine (ICM), and Empowerment Through Professional Identity Cultivation (EPIC). Students take the USMLE Step 1 exam prior to starting Phase 2.

== Notable faculty ==
- Paul Aisen
- Hortensia Amaro
- Michael L. J. Apuzzo
- David G. Armstrong
- Joseph Bogen
- Carolyn Cannon-Alfred
- Susan Durham
- Hans Einstein
- Roger O. Egeberg
- Marlena Fejzo
- Scott E. Fraser
- Martin Grotjahn
- Sofia Gruskin
- Joshua H. Ritchie
- Astrid Heppenstall Heger
- Danny Hillis
- Joan Hodgman
- Todd M. Hutton
- Frank Jobe
- Jae U. Jung
- Francine Ratner Kaufman
- Laurence H. Kedes
- Arnold Kegel
- Jonathan Kellerman
- Arnold Lockshin
- Stephanie J. London
- Peter J. McDonnell
- Don Harper Mills
- Seeley G. Mudd
- Konstantina Nikita
- John Niparko
- Thomas Noguchi
- Arthur H. Parmelee
- Shahbudin Rahimtoola
- Joshua H. Ritchie
- Arno A. Roscher
- Paul Saltman
- Joseph E. Scherger
- Edward L. Schneider
- Donald G. Skinner
- Frederick A. Speik
- Natalie Strand
- Jesse Leonard Steinfeld
- Mariana C. Stern
- Paul Thompson
- Arthur W. Toga
- Amytis Towfighi
- Leslie Weiner
- Martin H. Weiss
- Jian-Min Yuan

== Alumni ==
The Salerni Collegium Alumni Association is the Keck School of Medicine's alumni association and was founded in 1958. The Salerni Collegium is led by an alumni executive board as well as a student chapter board composed of current Keck medical students.

Notable alumni of the school include

- Antonio Alamo Jr.
- Karen Bass, physician assistant and Mayor of Los Angeles
- Vanessa Block
- William Bronston
- Rene Cailliet
- Margaret Chung, first known Chinese-American female physician
- Susan Cotter
- Jeffrey Ross Gunter
- Randal Haworth, Beverly Hills plastic surgeon and TV personality
- Rahul Jandial
- Barry Kerzin
- Sammy Lee, Korean-American Olympic swimmer and physician
- Robert F. Maronde
- Helen S. Mayberg, neurologist
- Paul Nassif
- Andrew P. Ordon
- Drew Pinsky, internist and TV personality
- Scott C. Ratzan
- Ali Rezai
- Katie Rodan
- Richard Allen Williams
- Diana Ramos, California Surgeon General
- Eila C. Skinner

== Controversies ==
The Los Angeles Times reported in July 2017 that while Carmen Puliafito served as a USC professor and medical school dean, he "kept company with a circle of criminals and drug users who said he used methamphetamine and other drugs with them." The reporters reviewed video and photographs of Puliafito engaging in these activities in hotel rooms, apartments, and the dean's office. According to the newspaper, a 21-year-old prostitute had overdosed while taking drugs with Puliafito in a Pasadena hotel room on March 4, 2016; the article included a recording of a conversation between a 911 operator and Puliafito. The report said that police had found methamphetamine in the room. Puliafito resigned as dean three weeks afterwards. Immediately following the publication of the Los Angeles Times report, USC announced that Puliafito had been placed "on leave from his roles at USC, including seeing patients." In 2018, Puliafito's California medical license was revoked.

USC announced that Varma was no longer dean in October 2017, when the Los Angeles Times told the school it was going to publish a story about a 2003 sexual harassment finding by USC against Varma which had not been publicly disclosed previously.
