= Robert E. Tranquada =

American medical school dean (1930–2022)

Tranquada in an undated photo

Robert E. Tranquada (1930 – December 4, 2022) was an American doctor and academic administrator. He was dean of the University of Massachusetts Medical School from 1979 to 1986, and of the University of Southern California School of Medicine from 1986 to 1991.

== Early life ==
Tranquada graduated from Pomona College in 1951, and earned his medical degree from the Stanford University School of Medicine in 1955.

== Career ==
Tranquada was dean of the University of Massachusetts Medical School from 1979 to 1986, and of the University of Southern California School of Medicine from 1986 to 1991. He was also president of the Pomona College Board of Trustees starting in 1991.
