= David G. Armstrong =

American podiatric surgeon and researcher

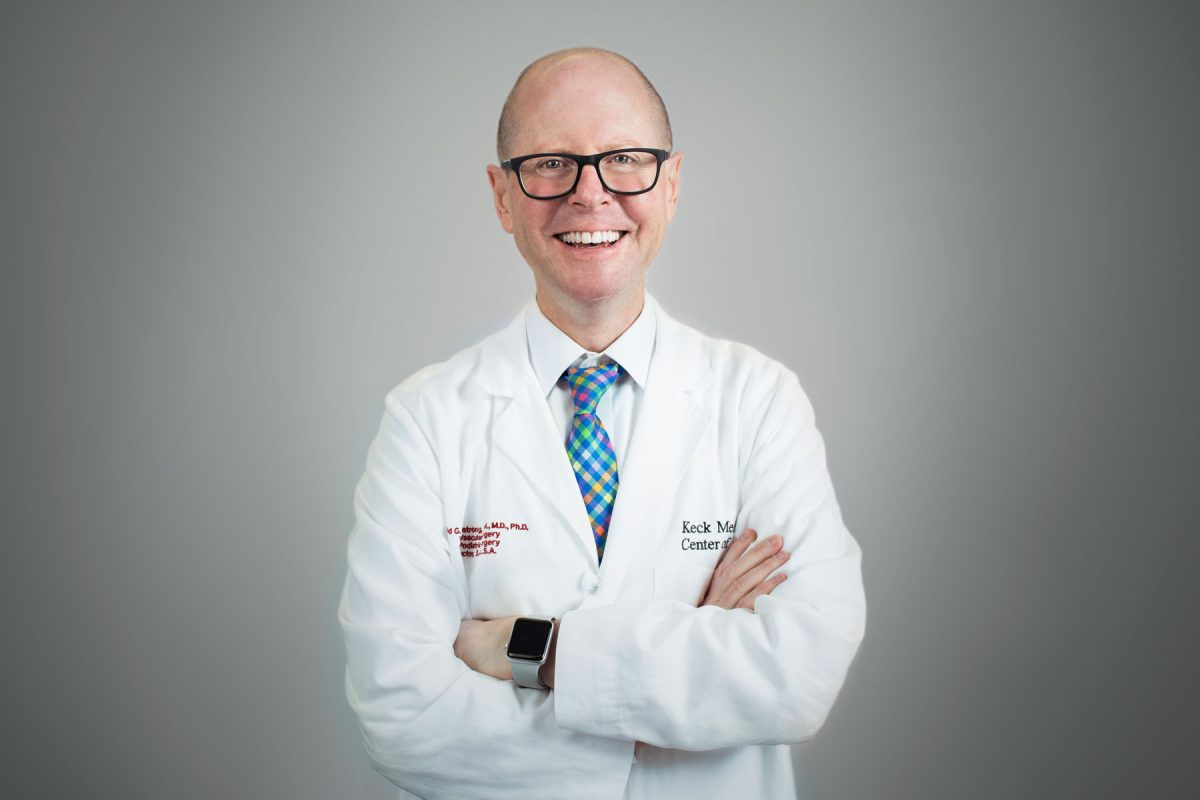
- Born: February 18, 1969 (age 57); Santa Maria, California, U.S.
- Occupations: Physician, Researcher
- Writing career
- Notable works: University of Texas Wound Classification System, Instant Total Contact Cast, "Diabetic Foot in Remission" concept

David G. Armstrong (born February 18, 1969) is an American podiatric surgeon and academic known for his work in diabetic foot care, wound healing, and limb preservation. He is a Distinguished Professor of Surgery and Neurological Surgery at the University of Southern California (USC), where he directs the university's Center to Stream Healthcare in Place (C2SHiP), a National Science Foundation–funded initiative focused on advancing home-based health technologies and care models. Armstrong is the founding president of the American Limb Preservation Society (ALPS) and co-founder and co-chair of the International Diabetic Foot Conference (DFCon), the largest annual international symposium on the diabetic foot in the world. He also co-founded the Southwestern Academic Limb Salvage Alliance (SALSA) and has contributed to the development of interdisciplinary strategies for managing chronic limb-threatening ischemia and preventing diabetes-related amputations.

== Early life and education ==
David G. Armstrong was raised in Santa Maria, California. His father, Leo N. Armstrong, was a podiatrist.

After attending the Dunn School in Los Olivos, California, Armstrong attended Occidental College in Los Angeles and later the California College of Podiatric Medicine, where he graduated with honors. Armstrong performed his residency at the Kern Hospital for Special Surgery in Detroit. He holds a Master of Science in Tissue Repair and Wound Healing from the University of Wales College of Medicine and a PhD from the University of Manchester College of Medicine.

== Career ==
Armstrong began his academic career at Rosalind Franklin University of Medicine and Science, where he served as Professor of Surgery and Associate Dean at the Scholl College of Podiatric Medicine. He later moved to Tucson and accepted an offer at the University of Arizona. In 2017, Armstrong was honored as University Distinguished Outreach Professor of Surgery—the first ever in the history of the University of Arizona's Department of Surgery.

Following the University of Arizona, Armstrong accepted a position at the Keck School of Medicine of the University of Southern California's Department of Surgery, where he was later named Distinguished Professor of Surgery and Neurological Surgery. In 2025, USC bestowed upon Armstrong the title of Distinguished Professor—one of the university's highest academic honors—making him the first Doctor of Podiatric Medicine to receive this distinction at USC.

== Research ==
Armstrong's research focuses on diabetic foot care, wound healing, limb preservation, and the application of wearable health technologies to remote patient monitoring. He has produced more than 740 peer-reviewed research papers and over 120 books or book chapters. As of December 2024, his work has been cited over 80,000 times, with an h-index of 125. He is the leading researcher in the diabetic foot and wound healing as measured by h-index and impact by bibliometric studies and expertscape.

Armstrong's key contributions to the field include the University of Texas Wound Classification System, the Instant Total Contact Cast, the Diabetic Foot Surgery Classification System, the Team Approach to Amputation Prevention and Comprehensive Diabetic Foot Assessment Guidelines, and the concept of "the diabetic foot in remission," an effort to maximize ulcer-free, hospital-free, and activity-rich days for patients.

As director of C2SHiP, Armstrong leads research at the intersection of consumer electronics, wearable devices, and medical technology aimed at enabling remote patient monitoring and reducing hospitalization for people with chronic conditions.

== Recognition and awards ==
In 2007, Armstrong was honored with the inaugural Georgetown Distinguished Award for Diabetic Limb Salvage. In 2008, he was the 25th and youngest-ever member elected to the Podiatric Medicine Hall of Fame.

In 2010, he was the youngest ever recipient of the Roger Pecoraro Award and Lectureship from the American Diabetes Association. That same year, he was also named the 2010 Honorary Fellow of the American College of Certified Wound Specialists as well as the inaugural recipient of the William S. Baer Award for Advances in Biosurgery/Biotherapy by the BioTherapeutics, Education & Research (BTER) Foundation.

He was the first podiatric surgeon to become a member of the Society for Vascular Surgery and the first American podiatric surgeon to be named fellow of the Royal College of Physicians and Surgeons, Glasgow.

Armstrong is past Chair of Scientific Sessions for the ADA's Foot Care Council, and a past member of the National Board of Directors of the American Diabetes Association. He sits on the Infectious Diseases Society of America's Diabetic Foot Infection Advisory Committee. In 2011, he was appointed Chair of the World Diabetic Foot Commission of the FIP, representing clinicians from more than 30 nations.

Armstrong has been conferred the title of Visiting Professor at the University of Manchester College of Medicine, the University of Cardiff College of Medicine, the Raine Visiting Professor (the first to be named twice) at the University of Western Australia, the University of Cincinnati during its 200th anniversary, and the Complutense University of Madrid. In 2024, he was the first podiatric surgeon to deliver grand rounds at the University of Padova's Department of Plastic and Reconstructive Surgery, and the first podiatric surgeon to be appointed Visiting Professor of Surgery at the University of Massachusetts Medical School. He was also named Singapore Ministry of Health Visiting Professor and Expert in Limb Preservation in 2024.

In 2023, Armstrong was honored with the Karel Bakker Limb Preservation Award at the International Symposium on the Diabetic Foot in The Hague. Also in 2023, Armstrong received the Distinguished Investigator Award from the Association for Clinical and Translational Science (ACTS).

In 2024, Armstrong was honored with the inaugural Lifetime Achievement Award by the Diabetic Foot Society of India at a combined conference of DFSI, D-Foot International, and the International Association of Diabetic Foot Surgeons in Mumbai. That same year, he delivered the 38th Prof. M. Viswanathan Gold Medal Oration at the MV Hospital for Diabetes in Chennai.

In 2006, Armstrong was awarded the Father of the Year Award by the National Father's Day Council and the Chicago Area American Diabetes Association.

== Personal life ==
He lives in Los Angeles with his wife Tania. They have three daughters.
