= Jae U. Jung =

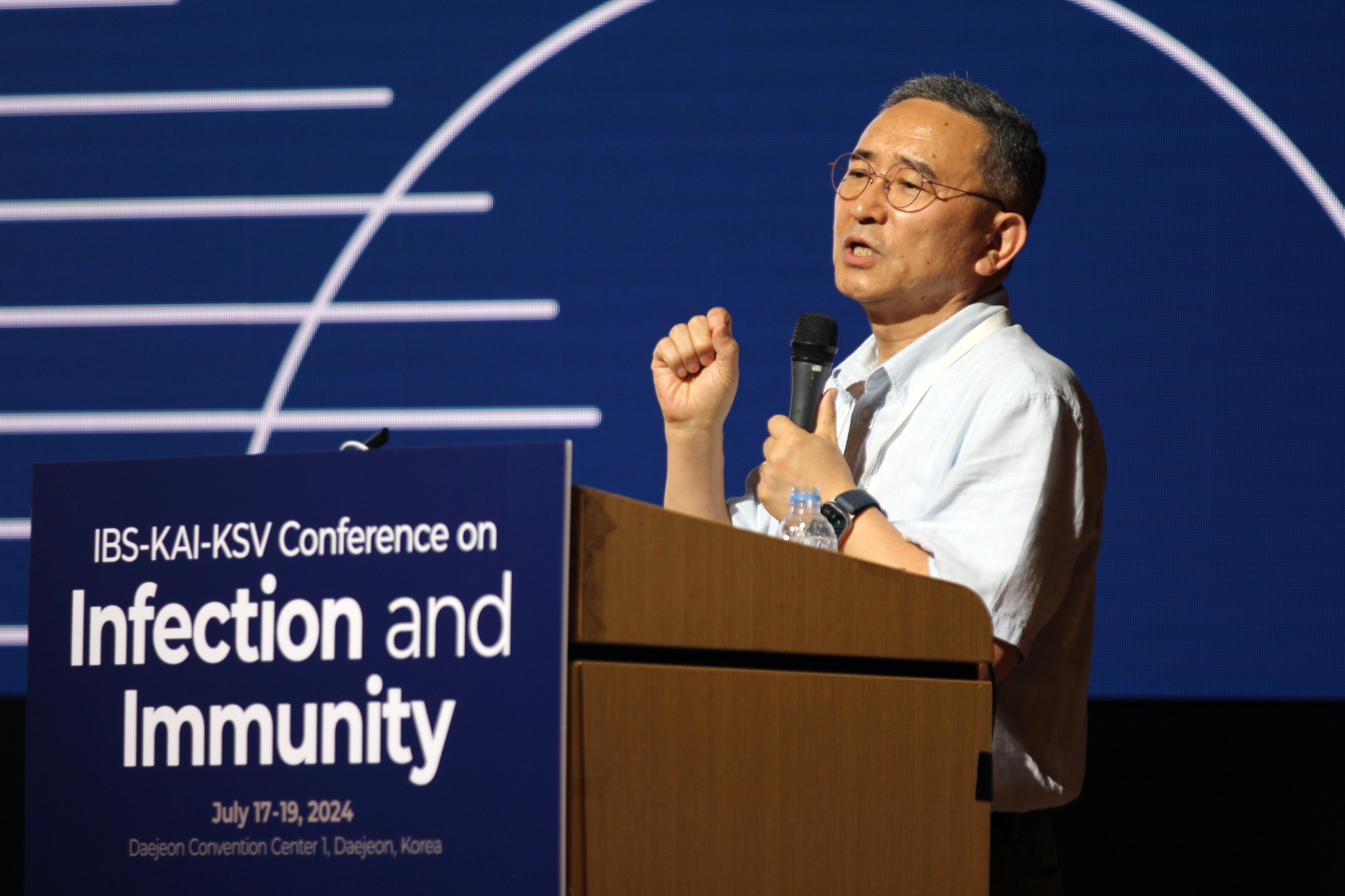
- Born: 1960 (age 65–66)
- Education: B.S. Seoul National University, Korea (1982) M.S. Seoul National University, Korea(1984) Ph.D. University of California-Davis(1989)
- Awards: 2012 Ho-Am Prize in Medicine
- Scientific career
- Fields: Medicine, Molecular Biology
- Workplaces: Keck School of Medicine of USC

Korean name
- Hangul: 정재웅
- RR: Jeong Jaeung
- MR: Chŏng Chaeung

Jae U. Jung is an expert in the molecular biology of herpes viruses and their gene products as they relate to cell biology, biochemistry and immunology. His research addresses several key biological features of virus-host interactions, with a focus on host immune responses to viruses, mechanisms by which viruses induce tumors, and the ability of viruses to establish lifelong infections.

== Education ==
- 1982 B.S. Seoul National University, Korea
- 1984 M.S. Seoul National University, Korea
- 1989 Ph.D. University of California-Davis

== Known for ==
- Virus-induced cancer
- Cell death: apoptosis and autophagy
- Host and virus controls of interferon-mediated antiviral activity
- Embryonic stem cell study for viral replication

== Publications ==
- Gack, MU; Kirchhofer, A; Shin, YC; Inn, KS; Liang, C; Cui, S; Myong, S; Ha, T; Hopfner, KP; Jung, JU (Oct 2008). "Roles of RIG-I N-terminal tandem CARD and splice variant in TRIM25-mediated antiviral signal transduction". Proc Natl Acad Sci U S A. 105 (43): 16743–8. Bibcode:2008PNAS..10516743G. doi:10.1073/pnas.0804947105. PMC 2575490. PMID 18948594.
- Liang, C; Lee, JS; Jung, JU (2008). "Immune evasion in KSHV-associated oncogenesis". Semin Cancer Biol. 18 (6): 423–436. doi:10.1016/j.semcancer.2008.09.003. PMC 7386567. PMID 18948197.
- Sir, D; Liang, C; Chen, WL; Jung, JU; Ou, JH (Aug 2008). "Perturbation of autophagic pathway by hepatitis C virus". Autophagy. 4 (6): 830–1. doi:10.4161/auto.6566. PMC 2574555. PMID 18635950.
- Liang, C; Sir, D; Lee, S; Ou, JH; Jung, JU (Aug 2008). "Beyond autophagy: the role of UVRAG in membrane trafficking". Autophagy. 4 (6): 817–20. doi:10.4161/auto.6496. PMC 2878715. PMID 18612260.

== Awards and honors ==
- 1986 Distinguished Graduate Fellowship
- 1987 - 1989 Jastro Shields Graduate Research Award
- 1998 Appreciation award from Korean Bioscience Association
- 1999 SBR/CKD Bioscience Award
- 2000 - 2005 The Leukemia & Lymphoma Society Scholar Award
- 2004 NEBS-KOSEN Research Award
- 2012 Ho-Am Prize in Medicine
