= Stacey Finley =

American biologist and geneticist

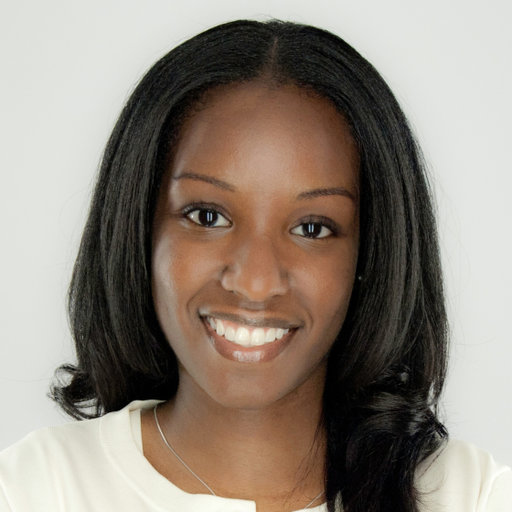
- Born: Kansas City, Kansas
- Education: Northwestern University; Florida A & M University
- Scientific career
- Workplaces: University of Southern California; Johns Hopkins University
- Thesis: Computational approaches to systems biology: Applications in xenobiotic metabolism and cellular signaling (2009)
- Doctoral advisor: Linda Broadbelt
- Website: CSBL

Stacey Finley is the Nichole A. and Thuan Q. Pham Professor and professor of biomedical engineering, chemical engineering and materials science, and quantitative and computational biology at the University of Southern California. Finley has a joint appointment in the department of chemical engineering and materials science, and she is a member of the USC Norris Comprehensive Cancer Center. Finley is also a standing member of the MABS Study Section at NIH. Her research has been supported by grants from the NSF, NIH, and American Cancer Society.

== Early life and education ==
Finley held an interest in science and math since an early age and so pursued engineering, stating that it was an "analytical decision" for her: "I had this equation -- what am I good at, what am I interested in, and how do those things fit together?" Finley studied chemical engineering at Florida A&M University, graduating summa cum laude. She went on to study at Northwestern University for her graduate program, working with Linda Broadbelt and Vassily Hatzimanikatis. During her doctorate she developed a computational framework, BNICE, to predict novel biodegradation pathways with applications for bioremediation. Finley was a postdoctoral fellow at Johns Hopkins University, where she worked with Aleksander S. Popel. There she studied the signaling pathways of VEGF, a protein that contributes to angiogenesis. She created a physiologically-based computational framework to study VEGF kinetics and transport that can better inform cancer therapies.

== Research and career ==
Finley started her computational systems biology lab at USC Viterbi in 2013. Her lab leverages computational models to interrogate angiogenesis, metabolism, and immunotherapy. Finley's lab has built mathematical models to predict CAR T cell response to variations in protein expression.

In 2017 Finley was appointed the Gordon S. Marshall Early Career Chair Director for Computational Modeling of Cancer. She is also an active participant in increasing diversity in STEM, either by visiting middle and high schools or through panels to encourage under-represented minorities to pursue STEM careers.

In 2022, she served as a visiting professor at EPFL - École polytechnique fédérale de Lausanne.

=== Awards and honors ===
Her awards and honors include:

- 2006 National Science Foundation Graduate Research Fellowship
- 2008 Merck Poster Award
- 2010-2021 UNCF/Merck Postdoctoral Science Research Fellowship
- 2010 National Institutes of Health Ruth L. Kirschstein National Research Service Award
- 2011 Elmer Gaden Jr. Award from the journal Biotechnology and Bioengineering
- 2013-2017 Gabilan Assistant Professorship (2013-2017)
- 2014 National Academy of Engineering Participant in Frontiers in Engineering Education Symposium
- 2015 Diverse: Issues in Higher Education Emerging Scholar Award
- 2015 Emerging Scholar Award from the publication Diverse: Issues in Higher Education
- 2015 Rose Hills Foundation Research Fellowship
- 2016 Keystone Symposia Fellow
- 2016 National Science Foundation CAREER Award
- 2016 CMBE Young Innovator
- 2016 National Academy of Engineering Frontiers in Engineering
- 2017 Leah-Edelstein Keshet Prize, Society of Mathematical Biology
- 2017 Hanna Reisler Mentorship Award
- 2017 USC Viterbi Junior Research Award
- 2017-2021 Gordon S. Marshall Early Career Chair
- 2018 Outstanding Young Engineer, Orange County Engineering Council
- 2018 American Association for Cancer Research NextGen Star
- 2021 Fellow, American Institute for Medical and Biological Engineering
- 2022–Present, Nichole A. and Thuan Q. Pham Professorship
- 2022 Fellow, Biomedical Engineering Society
