= Refuah Institute =

The Refuah Institute is a non-profit haredi Orthodox Jewish training institute in Jerusalem, Israel. It was established in 2001, by an American Professor (of medicine), Joshua H. Ritchie, MD and is partially funded by a sister organization in New York.

Refuah Institute trains its students in "secular" techniques such as Applied Positive Psychology, Cognitive Therapy, Neuro-Linguistic Programming and Reality Therapy. Students have become counselors, coaches and therapists, usually working within the Haredi community in Israel and the US, in a variety of areas including Life coaching, Reality Therapy, Marriage counseling, and youth counseling for children within the community. The Institute's courses and faculty include both men and women. One of the center's female alumni was profiled in a 2012 New York Times article on life-coaching.

Refuah Institute has close ties to the North American Haredi community, with many American teachers and courses in English. Most of the institute's trainers are Rabbis, some with PhD's from secular universities (mainly in psychology) and students are expected to put their studies within the context of the Jewish Halacha.

("Refuah" is a Hebrew word that refers to healing.)

== Faculty ==
Some of the faculty are members of the Association of Orthodox Jewish Scientists. Notable faculty members are Thomas Crane MBA, author of the “Heart of Coaching", Professor Yaacov Zeisel, Fredrick Mael PhD, Rabbi Eliezer Glatt MA, Allan Gonsher PhD and author Miriam Adahan PhD. A few are associated with Aish HaTorah, a Haredi Jewish-outreach organization with Zionist inclinations (senior faculty include Rabbi Zelig Pliskin and Rabbi Yitzchak Berkovits).

== Rabbinical supervision ==
Like all Haredi organizations, Refuah Institute is subject to rabbinical supervision, in this case Rabbi Zev Leff, Rabbi Osher Weiss, Rabbi Chaim Pinchas Scheinberg and the Amshinov Rebbe Rabbi Milikovski.
