= Joan Hodgman =

American physician

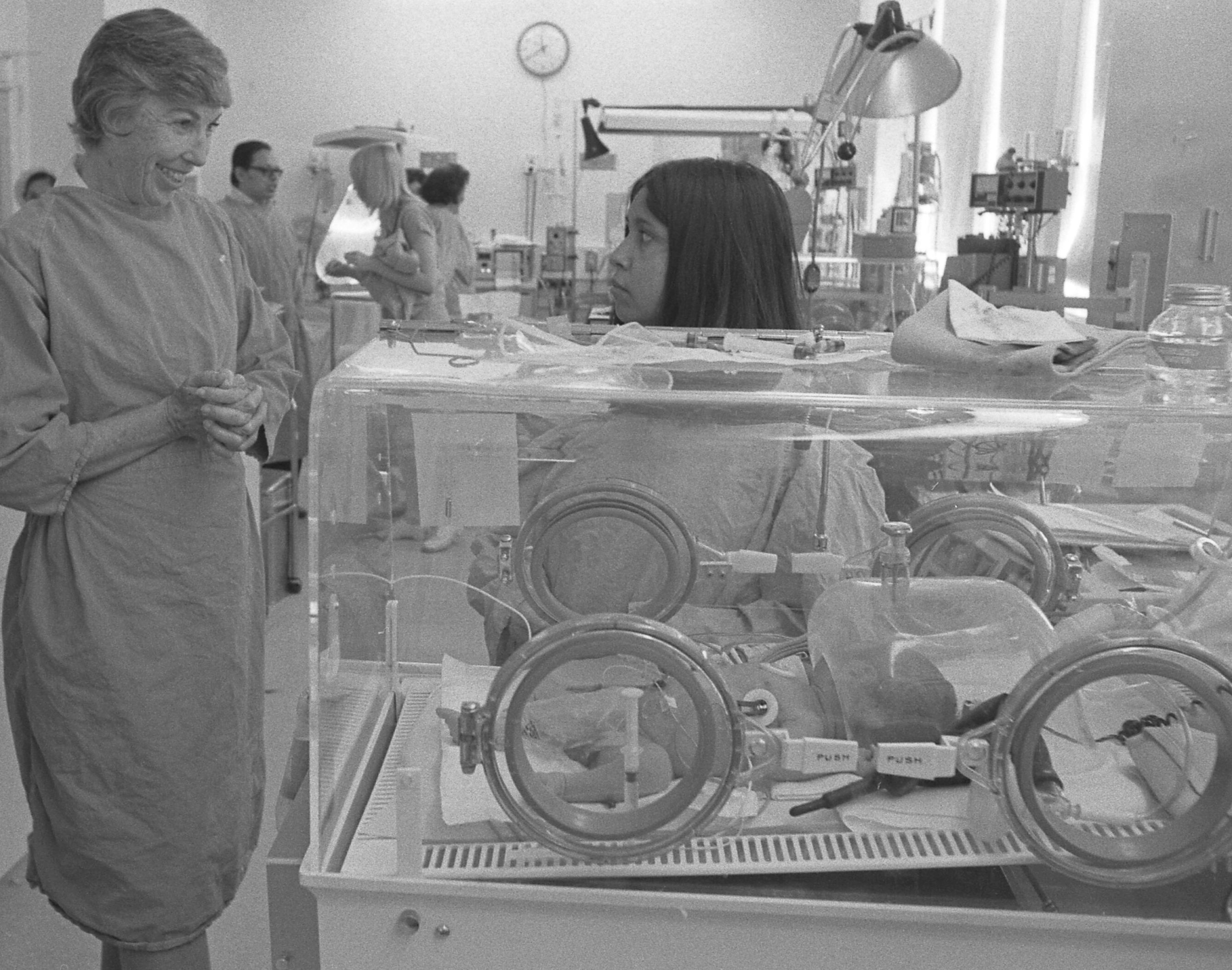
- Hodgman, left, speaking with a mother about her 48-hour-old son in incubator, 1976
- Born: Joan Hodgman; September 7, 1923; Portland, Oregon, U.S.
- Died: August 10, 2008 (aged 84); Oregon, U.S.
- Education: Stanford University (BA); UC San Francisco School of Medicine (MD)
- Occupation: Neonatologist
- Spouse: Amos Schwartz
- Relatives: Donald Hodgman (brother)
- Writing career
- Notable work: Sids (2004)

Joan Hodgman (7 September 1923 – 10 August 2008) (first name pronounced jo-ANN) was a pioneer of neonatology. Her leadership and influence helped develop neonatology as a specialty. She practiced at LAC+USC Medical Center for more than 60 years, holding various positions, including Director of the Divisions of Neonatology. She worked to develop the intensive care unit with guidelines on neonatal care. She later received the AAP Virginia Apgar Award in 1999, the highest award offered in neonatology. She is well known by all practicing neonatologists; Dr. Opas, chief of pediatrics at USC referred to her as one of neonatology's "great sages."

== Early life ==
Joan Hodgman was born on September 7, 1923, in Portland, Oregon but was raised in San Marino, California by her mother and father. Her father was an Army Corps engineer, while her mother was involved in various volunteer committees. Hodgman, along with her brother, grew up in San Marino, but spent every summer at their family cabin in the Cascade Mountains.

== Education ==
Hodgman attended Stanford University at age 16, earning her bachelor's degree in 1943. She later attended medical school at UC San Francisco School of Medicine where she was one of the only females in her class. After medical school, Hodgman attended County-USC in 1950 for a residency in pediatrics. She eventually became the head physician of pediatrics at County-USC in 1952 and founded the newborn division in 1957, where she developed protocols for treatment of newborn infants, eventually helping to establish neonatology as a sub specialty in medicine.

== Professional accomplishments ==
Spent 60 years working at Los Angeles County-USC Medical Center. During this time created and became director of it newborn division from 1957 to 1986

Hodgman went on to hold memberships on several committees and remained an advocate for women in medicine throughout her life.

She served on the following committees:

- Provisional Committee on Women in Pediatrics (1985-’86)
- Provisional Committee on Careers and Opportunities (1986-’89)
- The Committee on Careers and Opportunities (1989-’92)
- AAP Council on Sections Management Committee (1993-’94)
- AAP Media Resource Team (1999)
- Chair of the Medical Advisory Committee of the National Foundation of the March of Dimes (1972-’75)
- Founding Member and board member of the California Association of Neonatologists

Furthermore, she was named Woman of the Year in Science by the Los Angeles Times in 1976.

She also helped set up one of the first neonatology labs in the United States at County-USC.

She received several awards throughout her career, culminating in the 1999 Apgar Award from the American Academy of Pediatrics, the highest honor in neonatology

In memory of her life and legacy as a teacher, her colleagues created the Joan E. Hodgman, M.D. Endowed Scholarship.

== Areas of Research ==
According to her faculty page on USC's Keck School of Medicine website, her research interests included:

- Sudden Infant Death Syndrome (SIDS) - development of cardiopulmonary reflexes during sleep
- Respiratory function during sleep and risk for SIDS
- Bilirubin metabolism in the neonate
- Inflammation at birth and its relation to chronic problems such as chronic lung disease and cerebral palsy

== Personal life ==
Hodgman was an accomplished athlete who skied well into her 70s and worked until the year she died. She was raised with the belief and encouragement that being a woman shouldn't stand in her way. Widowed at 47, she never remarried.

She encouraged the discussion of controversial questions regarding appropriate care for extremely ill infants.
