= Carolyn Cannon-Alfred =

American pharmacologist

- Born: August 16, 1934; Tyler, Texas, U.S.
- Died: August 29, 1987 (aged 53); Los Angeles, California, U.S.
- Education: University of Toledo; Howard University; Georgetown University
- Spouse: J. Tyrone Alfred
- Children: 3
- Scientific career
- Fields: Cardiac and autonomic pharmacology
- Workplaces: Riker Laboratories; California Riverside Hospital; Keck School of Medicine of USC
- Thesis: The nature of Cocaine desensitization of Ephedrine Pressor responses (1961)

Carolyn L. Cannon-Alfred (born August 16, 1934 – August 29, 1987) was an American pharmacologist who established a medical clinic in South-central Los Angeles. She was an assistant professor of pharmacology at the Keck School of Medicine of USC and a senior pharmacologist at Riker Laboratories. Cannon-Alfred co-authored the Medical Handbook for the Layman in 1969.

== Early life and education ==
She was born on August 16, 1934, in Tyler, Texas. She graduated from Emmett J. Scott High School in 1950. Cannon-Alfred was a member of the St. James Colored Methodist Episcopal Church.

In 1954, she completed a bachelor's from the University of Toledo. Later, she earned a masters degree from Howard University in 1957. Her thesis was entitled Studies on the acute effects of cortisone, with special reference to the heart: influence of potassium, digitalis and N-Allyl-Nor-Morphine (Nalline).

She was hired as an assistant pharmacologist and instructor of pharmacology at Howard University between 1957 and 1959. She earned a Ph.D. in pharmacology from Georgetown University in 1961. Her dissertation was titled The nature of Cocaine desensitization of Ephedrine Pressor responses.

== Career ==
Carolyn worked as a Senior Pharmacologist at Riker Laboratories, and in 1962 she took a research associate position at California Riverside Hospital. She received a two-year research grant from the National Heart Institute in 1964, and she moved to the Keck School of Medicine of USC as an assistant professor of pharmacology.Cannon-Alfred researched cardiac and autonomic pharmacology.

Together with her husband, J. Tyrone Alfred, wrote Medical Handbook for the Layman. The city council of Los Angeles honored the couple for the book and presented them with a council resolution in a 1971 ceremony held at city hall. She and her husband established a medical clinic in south-central Los Angeles, and Cannon-Alfred's wish was to buy an apartment complex in the area that could serve as living arrangements for senior citizens.

== Personal life ==
Cannon-Alfred was married to J. Tyrone Alfred, with whom she had three daughters. Carolyn died on August 29, 1987 in a Los Angeles hospital after a sudden illness.

== Selected publications ==
The most relevant publication of her career were the Medical Handbook for the Layman co-authored with her husband, and the scientific paper product of her doctoral dissertation.

- Cannon, Carolyn; Cowan, F. F.; Koppanyi, T.; Maengwyn-Davies, G. D. (1961-10-13). "Explanation of Cocaine Desensitization of Blood Pressure Responses to Ephedrine". Science. 134 (3485): 1075–1077. doi:10.1126/science.134.3485.1075.b. PMID 13876233. S2CID 239862332.
- Alfred, J. Tyrone; Cannon-Alfred, Carolyn (1969). Medical handbook for the layman. Alfred and Alfred.
