= Ronald Opus =

Urban legend

Ronald Opus is the subject of a fictional murder/suicide case, often misreported as a true story.

The case was originally told by Don Harper Mills, then president of the American Academy of Forensic Sciences, in a speech at a banquet in 1987. After it began to circulate on the internet as a factual story and attained the status of urban legend, Mills stated that he made it up as an illustrative anecdote "to show how different legal consequences can follow each twist in a homicide inquiry".

The story first appeared on the Internet in August 1994 and has been widely circulated since, on webpages, in chat rooms, and even print publications. The reprints often include Mills's name and place it at a 1994 event, or attribute it to a supposed Associated Press report of the banquet. Mills expresses little surprise, calling it "a fabulous story" and has fielded numerous inquiries about it over the years.

The incident has been adapted for various media, notably the Paul Thomas Anderson film Magnolia (1999) in which the protagonist is reimagined as "Sydney Barringer".

== The case ==
The popular account of the story is told as follows:

On March 23, 1994, a medical examiner viewed the body of Ronald Opus and concluded that he died from a gunshot wound of the head caused by a shotgun. Investigation to that point had revealed that the decedent had jumped from the top of a ten-story building with the intent to commit suicide. (He left a note indicating his despondency.) As he passed the 9th floor on the way down, his life was interrupted by a shotgun blast through a window, killing him instantly. Neither the shooter nor the decedent was aware that a safety net had been erected at the 8th floor level to protect some window washers, and that the decedent would most likely not have been able to complete his intent to commit suicide because of this.

Ordinarily, a person who sets out to commit suicide and ultimately succeeds, even if the mechanism might not be what they intended, is defined as having committed suicide. That he was shot on the way to certain death nine stories below probably would not change his mode of death from suicide to homicide, but the fact that his suicide intent would not have been achieved under any circumstance caused the medical examiner to feel that he had homicide on his hands.

Further investigation led to the discovery that the room on the 9th floor whence the shotgun blast emanated was occupied by an elderly man and his wife. He was threatening her with the shotgun because of an interspousal spat and became so upset that he could not hold the shotgun straight. Therefore, when he pulled the trigger, he completely missed his wife, and the pellets went through the window, striking the decedent.

When one intends to kill subject A but kills subject B in the attempt, one is guilty of the murder of subject B. The old man was confronted with this conclusion, but both he and his wife were adamant in stating that neither knew that the shotgun was loaded. It was the longtime habit of the old man to threaten his wife with an unloaded shotgun. He had no intent to murder her; therefore, the killing of the decedent appeared then to be accident. That is, the gun had been accidentally loaded.

But further investigation turned up a witness that their son was seen loading the shotgun approximately six weeks prior to the fatal accident. That investigation showed that the mother (the old lady) had cut off her son's financial support, and her son, knowing the propensity of his father to use the shotgun threateningly, loaded the gun with the expectation that the father would shoot his mother. The case now becomes one of murder on the part of the son for the death of Ronald Opus.

Now comes the exquisite twist. Further investigation revealed that the son, Ronald Opus himself, had become increasingly despondent over the failure of his attempt to get his mother murdered. This led him to jump off the ten-story building on March 23, only to be killed by a shotgun blast through a 9th story window.

The medical examiner closed the case as a suicide.

== In popular culture ==
The case has appeared in the following media:

- In the TV series Homicide, episode 6.11 - "Shaggy Dog, City Goat".
- The case was reported as true on Art Bell's Coast to Coast AM in 1995.
- Law & Order, in which District Attorney Ben Stone merely offered a hypothetical example of a man who jumped off the Empire State Building because he wanted a ham sandwich and was shot on the way down by someone who thought he was committing suicide.
- Law & Order, episode 13.18 - "Maritime" Medical Examiner Elizabeth Rodgers talks briefly about a man who jumped off a building and was shot by a bullet on the way down, the medical examiner did not know whether to rule it as a suicide or homicide.
- In Australian TV show Murder Call, in a 1998 episode.
- In the 1999 film Magnolia, written and directed by Paul Thomas Anderson, although in this version some parts of the story are changed and several details are added to give more consistency to the plot.
- In the CSI: Miami episode "Spring Breakdown", a man was pushed off a building and was shot by a flare gun on the way down.
- The video game Hitman: Blood Money includes a news article about a man who committed suicide after failing to kill two Russian exchange students by poisoning their drinks and loading their gun with a bullet in hopes they will shoot each other during a Russian roulette. After failing to do so, he then tried to commit suicide by jumping from the 8th floor of his apartment building but was shot by said students during their Russian roulette game and subsequently died from the shot before falling towards the safety net below.
- The first track on the 2013 album Etiquette by Silvery is entitled "The Ronald Opus" and references the story.
- Sunday magazine edition of Pakistani newspaper Dunya featured it in its Sunday edition on 26 March 2016.
- In Part 6 of Jojo's Bizarre Adventure, Stone Ocean, an antagonist, Thunder McQueen, was sentenced to prison for murder after trying to commit suicide due to his crippling depression, but ended up misfiring the shotgun he was using which struck a woman who had jumped from the top of the building he was in, resulting in the misfire striking and killing her.
