= Paul Aisen =

American physician and medical researcher

Paul Stephen Aisen is an American physician and Alzheimer's disease researcher who is the founding director of the University of Southern California Alzheimer's Therapeutic Research Institute (ATRI). Since the 1990s, Aisen has been a leading figure in Alzheimer's disease research, developing novel methodologies and directing large-scale clinical trials to develop groundbreaking medications. Research that he co-authored led to the U.S. Food and Drug Administration's approval of some of the first Alzheimer's disease-modifying drugs. Aisen serves as the Epstein Alzheimer's disease director's chair and a professor of neurology at the Keck School of Medicine of USC.

== Education ==
Aisen earned his Bachelor of Arts degree in biochemistry and molecular biology from Harvard University and his medical degree from Columbia University. He completed his residency at Case Western Reserve University and Mount Sinai Medical Center in New York, where he also served as chief medical resident. Aisen trained further through a fellowship in rheumatology at New York University.

== Early career ==
Aisen began a solo private practice in internal medicine and rheumatology in New York and joined the faculty of Mount Sinai Medical Center in 1994. He had been recruited to provide geriatric medical care to patients receiving treatment for memory impairment. This work helped Aisen identify his ultimate career focus of studying and researching Alzheimer's disease and related conditions. In 1999, he was recruited to join the Georgetown University School of Medicine as a professor of neurology and medicine. There, he founded the Memory Disorders Program, a clinical and research program for Alzheimer's disease and related disorders.

In the early 2000s, Aisen worked on research studies to identify therapeutic targets and biomarkers for Alzheimer's disease and related disorders. He also designed and directed research as part of multi-location therapeutic trials. He became vice chair of Georgetown University's Department of Neurology in 2004.

The following year, Aisen was asked by leaders at the National Institutes of Health, as well as Leon Thal, one of the world's leading Alzheimer's disease researchers, to take on a role as associate director of the national Alzheimer's Disease Cooperative Study (ADCS). Thal had built it from an $18 million federal grant-funded operation in 1991 to a more than $100 million program coordinating and conducting trials at dozens of institutions from the homebase at University of California San Diego (UCSD). Among other work, ADCS coordinated studies on Alzheimer's disease drugs like solanezumab. After Thal died in 2007, Aisen as asked to serve as Director of the ADCS at UCSD, where he was also a professor in the Department of Neurosciences.

== Career ==
In 2015, Aisen founded ATRI, the San Diego-based satellite of the Keck School of Medicine of USC. Aisen and his team at ATRI rigorously study new compounds that could be used to prevent the advancement of Alzheimer's disease-related brain damage and eventually offer prevention strategies for asymptomatic people. They also work on a variety of treatments for those experiencing symptoms.

After Aisen left UCSD for USC in 2015, the two universities ended up in court over the question of which would house the Alzheimer's Disease Cooperative Study. At the time, the study involved six ongoing clinical trials and extensive data. Some aspects of data management were temporarily settled in 2016. A final settlement was reached in 2019, with USC agreeing to pay UCSD $50 million and make a public statement that is actions "did not align with the standards of ethics and integrity which USC expects of all its faculty, administrators, and staff."

In addition to managing the ACTC, Aisen and his team at ATRI coordinate the Alzheimer's Disease Neuroimaging Initiative (ADNI), a longitudinal observational study of Alzheimer's disease. ADNI is widely regarded to have pioneered real-time sharing of scientific data, an approach that has resulted in over 2,800 publications.

Under Aisen's leadership, ATRI also led the Anti-Amyloid Treatment in Asymptomatic Alzheimer's (A4) Study, the first and largest clinical trial of pre-symptomatic AD.

Aisen serves as a member of the Organizing Committee of the Clinical Trials on Alzheimer's Disease (CTAD). Aisen collaborates with other members to ensure that the meeting is focused on Alzheimer's disease therapeutic trials with key leaders from around the world.

Aisen is also editor-in-field of the Journal for the Prevention of Alzheimer's Disease, which publishes reviews, original research articles and short reports to improve knowledge in the field of Alzheimer's disease prevention.

To further patient safety and the development of effective therapeutics, Aisen has served as a consultant, advisor or contributor for pharmaceutical companies Eli Lilly, Janssen, and Eisai, as well as smaller biotech companies exploring alternative approaches to AD like Anavex Life Sciences, Proclara, CohBar, and NeuroPhage, as well as nonprofits like ACT-AD. He is a principal investigator in the Alzheimer's Disease Neuroimaging Initiative.

== Recognitions and honors ==
Aisen is recognized as one of the world's top-ranked experts in Alzheimer's disease. He has an h-index of 149, according to Google Scholar. He has published more than 500 peer-reviewed papers and has been named to the Clarivate Highly Cited Researchers list every year since 2021.

Aisen was honored as the Alzheimer's Association San Diego/Imperial Chapter's 2024 Research Champion for his role as a "leading figure in Alzheimer's disease (AD) research for three decades, having developed novel methodologies and directed many large therapeutic trials."

== Selected publications ==
- Sperling, R.A., Aisen, P.S., Beckett, L.A., Bennett, D.A., Craft, S., Fagan, A.M., …Phelps, C. H. (2011). Toward defining the preclinical stages of Alzheimer's disease: Recommendations from the National Institute on Aging-Alzheimer's Association workgroups on diagnostic guidelines for Alzheimer's disease. Alzheimer’s & Dementia, 7(3), 280–292. https://doi.org/10.1016/j.jalz.2011.03.003
- Jack, C.R. Jr., Knopman, D.S., Jagust, W.J., Shaw, L.M, Aisen, P.S., Weiner, M.W….Trojanowski, J.Q. (2010). Hypothetical model of dynamic biomarkers of the Alzheimer's pathological cascade. The Lancet, 9(1), 119–128. https://doi.org/10.1016/s1474-4422(09)70299-6
- Jack, C.R. Jr., Knopman, D.S., Jagust, W.J., Petersen, R.C., Weiner, M.W., Aisen, P.S.,…Trojanowski, J.Q. (2013). Tracking pathophysiological processes in Alzheimer's disease: an updated hypothetical model of dynamic biomarkers. The Lancet Neurology, 12(2), 207–216. https://doi.org/10.1016/S1474-4422(12)70291-0
