= Hortensia Amaro =

Cuban-American professor in public health

Hortensia Amaro is a Cuban-American educator, and formerly Distinguished Professor at Northeastern University and Associate Vice Provost of Community Research and Dean's Professor of Social Work and Preventative Medicine at the University of Southern California. Amaro was born in Cuba and moved to Los Angeles, California as a child. From a young age, she recognized that there was a demand for public health services in her area, particularly by immigrants and minorities. Amaro assisted in the development and implementation of numerous treatment and prevention models as well as the creation and establishment of several clinical interventions and programs dedicated to substance abuse, mental health and HIV/AIDS treatment and prevention that target women and minorities.

== Education ==
Amaro received her PhD from UCLA in 1982. After graduation she took a position at Boston University in the School of Public Health where she remained for nearly 20 years. In the early 2000s, Amaro transitioned to Northeastern University as the Associate Dean of Health Sciences for the Bouvé College of Health Sciences. In 2012, Amaro returned to California as Dean's Professor in the Suzanne Peck School of Social Work at the University of Southern California as well as in the Department of Preventive Medicine at the Keck School of Medicine of USC.

== The Institute on Urban Health and Practice ==
Amaro is the founder and former director of the IUHP at Northeastern University. Amaro developed the IUHP to serve as a research center where students, faculty, and community members come together to conduct research and cofunction as a health clinic. The IUHP targets issues surrounding health equity and disease prevention among residents of the greater Boston area. Amaro's research contributed significant findings to the prevention of HIV/AIDs in women and minorities. Consequently, Amaro developed and implemented numerous substance-abuse treatment and prevention programs at IUHP including:

- MOM's Outpatient Treatment Program
- Entre Familia Residential Treatment Program
- Moving on to Recovery and Empowerment (M.O.R.E.) "an intensive outpatient treatment program for low-income women of color with co-occurring disorders."
- Safe and Sound Return- Treatment Model for Incarcerated Women
- Boston Consortium of Services for Men in Recovery- 'a family-centered system of substance abuse treatment."

== Awards ==
- 2015: American Public Health Association: Sedwick Memorial Medal for Distinguished Service in Public Health.
- 2012: Recipient of an honorary Doctorate of Humane Letters from the Massachusetts School of Professional Psychology.
- 2000: Distinguished visiting professor Ben Gurion University, Beer Sheva, Israel.
- 1993: American Psychological Association: "Featured Psychologist" and recipient of Distinguished Contributors to Psychology in the Public Interest Early Career Award.
- 1991: American Psychological Association: (emerging) Women in Psychology Leadership Award.
- Hispanic Mental Health Professional Association's Rafael Tavares Award for Research
