= Carolyn C. Meltzer =

American neuroradiologist, nuclear medicine physician, and academic administrator

- Born: c. 1961
- Education: Cornell University; Johns Hopkins University
- Scientific career
- Fields: Neuroradiology, nuclear medicine
- Workplaces: University of Pittsburgh; Emory University; University of Southern California

Carolyn Cidis Meltzer (born c. 1961) is an American neuroradiologist, nuclear medicine physician, and academic administrator serving as the dean of the Keck School of Medicine of USC since 2022. She has made significant contributions to neuroimaging research, particularly in brain aging and Alzheimer's disease, and has held leadership positions at University of Pittsburgh, Emory University, and University of Southern California (USC).

== Early life and education ==
Meltzer was born c. 1961. Her father, an immigrant from Greece, aspired to be a physician but became an optometrist, while her mother worked as a secretary. Inspired by her father’s interest for math and science, Meltzer pursued an undergraduate degree at Cornell University, where she graduated with honors in biology and neurobiology.

Meltzer earned a Doctor of Medicine (M.D.) degree from Johns Hopkins School of Medicine, where she also completed her residency in diagnostic radiology and a fellowship in neuroradiology at Johns Hopkins Hospital. Her medical training laid the foundation for her subsequent specialization in neuroradiology and nuclear medicine. During her medical education, Meltzer was introduced to positron emission tomography (PET) imaging, which greatly influenced her career. She worked in some of the earliest studies involving PET imaging, including as a control subject, and later completed a PET research fellowship.

== Career ==
Meltzer began her academic and research career at the University of Pittsburgh School of Medicine, where she held various academic and administrative appointments including director of the PET center. She worked on developing quantitative assessment methods for PET imaging and participated in early evaluations of PET/CT scanners, contributing to advances in imaging technology. Her research during this period focused on brain structure and function, particularly as it relates to aging, dementia, Alzheimer's disease, and psychiatric disorders.

In 2007, Meltzer was recruited to Emory University, where she served as the William P. Timmie Professor and chair of the department of radiology and imaging sciences for fifteen years. At Emory, she expanded research initiatives, acquiring one of the first PET/MRI scanners in the country, and conducted research on brain aging, dementia, and psychiatric disorders. In 2010, Meltzer and her colleagues started the Emory Radiology Leadership Academy, a nine-month program designed to transition mid-career faculty and staff into the next phase of their careers. The program was established with the explicit goal of increasing diversity in each cohort. Meltzer also served as executive associate dean of faculty academic advancement, leadership, and inclusion, as well as chief diversity and inclusion officer at Emory University School of Medicine. During her time at Emory, she was awarded the Radiological Society of North America's outstanding researcher award in 2018 and the American Society of Neuroradiology’s gold medal in 2019.

Meltzer has been at the forefront of radiological research, contributing significantly to the understanding of neuropsychiatric disorders and the aging brain through the use of imaging technologies. Her work with PET imaging and the combined PET/CT scanner has been widely recognized. She developed methods to address challenges in PET imaging, such as partial-volume corrections to enhance the accuracy of brain imaging in older populations. Meltzer was also honored with the Marie Sklodowska-Curie Award from the American Association for Women Radiologists in 2021, further recognizing her impact on the field. In addition, she received the gold medal award from the Association of University Radiologists in 2018 and the distinguished service award from the American Medical Association in 2021.

In March 2022, Meltzer became the dean of the Keck School of Medicine of USC at the University of Southern California (USC). As dean, she oversees 26 basic and clinical academic programs and 16 major research institutes. She has been instrumental in fostering interdisciplinary research collaborations and expanding the school's clinical services. Her vision for the Keck School emphasizes diversity, inclusion, and community engagement, reflecting her long-standing commitment to social justice initiatives. Meltzer is also the May S. and John H. Hooval M.D. dean's chair and a professor of radiology.

In 2023, Meltzer was awarded the American College of Radiology's (ACR) gold medal, which is considered one of the highest honors in the field, recognizing her exceptional contributions to radiology. She was the fourteenth woman to win the award since its inception in 1927. The same year, Meltzer was elected a fellow of the American Association for the Advancement of Science.

== Personal life ==
Meltzer is a fine-art photographer. Her artwork has been featured in over fifty solo and group exhibitions across the United States and Europe. As of 2020, she serves on the board of Women In Focus, an organization supporting women fine-art photographers.
