= Todd M. Hutton =

- Citizenship: United States
- Education: M.D., University of California, Irvine School of Medicine (1989)
- Years active: 1993-current
- Medical career
- Profession: Psychiatrist
- Institutions: Keck School of Medicine at the University of Southern California; Huntington Memorial Hospital
- Sub-specialties: Transcranial magnetic stimulation

Todd M. Hutton is an American psychiatrist specializing in transcranial magnetic stimulation (TMS). He is Associate Clinical Professor of Psychiatry at the Keck School of Medicine of the University of Southern California. Hutton is also currently President of the Clinical TMS Society, as well as the founder and medical director of the Southern California TMS Center.

Hutton is particularly known for his pioneering work in the field and practice of transcranial magnetic stimulation, including various published studies about its clinical efficacy. He has also appeared as a featured guest on the national televised talk show The Doctors, produced by Phil McGraw, and was interviewed about his role in the development of transcranial magnetic stimulation as a clinical treatment method.

== Education ==
In 1985, Hutton graduated with a B.A. in Biology from the University of California, Irvine. In 1989, he received his M.D. from the University of California, Irvine School of Medicine, and in 1993 completed residency training at LAC+USC Medical Center. He also completed advanced TMS Therapy Fellowship at Duke University Medical Center in 2014.

== Career ==
Hutton has been practicing psychiatry since 1993, and has previously practiced at Community Medical Center Long Beach. He is currently on staff at the Huntington Memorial Hospital. Hutton founded the Southern California TMS Center in Pasadena, California as one of the first TMS providers in the United States, and has subsequently steadily expanded it to include several locations across the Greater Los Angeles area.

Hutton is a specialist in transcranial magnetic stimulation, which uses low-frequency magnetic fields to treat patients with depressive disorders. First used in 1985, the treatment method focuses on stimulating the left frontal lobe, which is often underactive in people with depressive and refractory mood disorders. Hutton has taken part in several studies on the clinical efficacy of TMS.

Active in the Clinical TMS Society since its founding in 2013, Hutton was elected Society President in 2018.

== Media ==
Hutton was a featured guest on the U.S. national talk show The Doctors, and has also been interviewed in several podcasts.

== Awards and affiliations ==
Some of Todd Hutton's selected awards, recognitions, and professional affiliations are listed below.

- 2019: Distinguished Fellow of the American Psychiatric Association
- 2018: Elected President of the Clinical TMS Society
- 1989: Sandos Award Recipient for Outstanding Research, University of California, Irvine School of Medicine
- 1989: Medical Faculty Wives Award for Outstanding Research, University of California, Irvine School of Medicine

== Selected publications ==
Some of Hutton's selected publications are listed below.

- Hutton, Todd. 2019. “Exploring TMS Therapy For Depressed Patients.” MD Magazine, Feb. 5, 2019.
- Antillon, D., Barragan, N., Jenkins J., Hutton J., Hutton. 2018. Clinical Efficacy of Transcranial Magnetic Stimulation for the Treatment of Major Depression in an Outpatient Setting. T. Brain Stimulation, Volume 11, Issue 3, May–June 2018, page e2.
- Mina, M., Brock, D., West, W., Hutton, T., Pages, K., & Kane, T. 2018. The NeuroStar Outcomes Registry. CNS Spectrums, 2018 Vol 23, Issue 1, 98-98. doi:10.1017/S1092852918000524
- Hutton, Todd M. 2015. Going Beyond Thirty Treatments: Three Case Reports Involving a High Number of Treatment Sessions in Acute and Long Term TMS Therapy, in Brain Stimulation Journal, vol. 8, issue 5 (September–October), p. E4. doi:10.1016/j.brs.2015.07.013
- Hutton, Todd M. 2014. The Clinical Application of Transcranial Magnetic Stimulation. Psychiatric Annals. 2014;44(6):305-309.
- Derstine T, Lanocha K, Wahlstrom C, Hutton TM (November 2010). "Transcranial magnetic stimulation for major depressive disorder: a pragmatic approach to implementing TMS in a clinical practice". Ann Clin Psychiatry. 22 (4 Suppl): S4–11. PMID 21180663.
