= Scott C. Ratzan =

American academic and editor

Academic background
- Education: Occidental College (BA); Emerson College (MA); Harvard University (MPA); University of Southern California (MD)

Academic work
- Discipline: Medicine; Public health Communications studies
- Sub-discipline: Health communication Health literacy Medical diplomacy
- Institutions: Tufts University; Columbia University; City University of New York

Scott C. Ratzan is distinguished lecturer at the CUNY Graduate School of Public Health and Health Policy. He serves as the editor-in-chief of the Journal of Health Communication and holds adjunct faculty appointments at Columbia University Mailman School of Public Health and Tufts University School of Medicine.

== Education ==
Ratzan earned a Bachelor of Arts degree in Rhetoric from Occidental College, a Master of Arts in Communication from Emerson College, and a Master of Public Administration from the Harvard Kennedy School. He received a Doctor of Medicine from the Keck School of Medicine of USC, where he is also listed as a notable alumnus.

== Career ==
Ratzan began his career in the 1990s as a professor and Founding Director of the Emerson-Tufts Masters Program in Health Communication. In 1995, he became founding Editor-in-Chief of the Journal of Health Communication: International Perspectives. From 1998 to 2000, Ratzan served as executive director of the AED. He later worked as a senior technical advisor in the Bureau of Global Health at the United States Agency for International Development from 2000-2002. From 2002 to 2013 he was vice president for pharmaceuticals, global health and policy at Johnson & Johnson based in Brussels and New Jersey headquarters.

Ratzan contributed in several roles in public health and global health governance. In 2000, Ratzan co-authored the definition of the term health literacy adopted by HHS and integrated in the Affordable Care Act, defined as "the degree to which an individual has the capacity to obtain, communicate, process, and understand basic health information and services to make appropriate health decisions." He is a member of the Board of Global Health of the National Academies of Science, Engineering, and Medicine. From 2010 to 2013, he co-chaired the Innovation Working Group in support of Every Woman Every Child, a United Nations initiative aimed at improving health outcomes for women and children. From 2012-2016, he served on the Centers for Disease Control and Prevention, Board of Scientific Counselors, Office of Infectious Disease. He currently co-chairs the Council for Quality Health Communication.

From 2018 to 2019, he was a senior fellow at the Mossavar-Rahmani Center for Business & Government at Harvard Kennedy School, where he contributed to the development of the Guiding Principles for Multisectoral Engagement for Sustainable Health. He served as the executive director of Business Partners for Sustainable Development, an initiative of the United States Council for International Business (USCIB) focused on advancing the Sustainable Development Goals (SDGs).

Ratzan is a co-founder of CONVINCE, a global initiative promoting vaccine confidence and uptake. He was also involved in the development of Text4Baby, a national health-related text messaging service for pregnant women.

As of 2025, he serves as co-chair of the Nature Medicine Commission on Quality Health Information for All, alongside Heidi Larson, Larry Gostin, and Carolina Batista. The international initiative focuses on improving the credibility, accessibility, and governance of global health information.

Ratzan has over 175 publications indexed in PubMed and has written op-eds or commentary for outlets including The Washington Post, The New York Times, The Wall Street Journal and Financial Times.
