= Eila C. Skinner =

American urologic oncologist and surgeon

- Education: Stanford University; University of Southern California
- Scientific career
- Fields: Urologic oncology, surgery
- Workplaces: University of Southern California; Stanford University

Eila Curlee Skinner is an American urologic oncologist and surgeon specializing in bladder reconstruction and continent urinary diversion. She is the Thomas A. Stamey Research professor and chair of urology at the Stanford University School of Medicine.

== Life ==
Skinner earned an A.B. in human biology from Stanford University in 1976. She was inducted into Phi Beta Kappa that year. Skinner received a M.D. from the Keck School of Medicine of USC in 1983. At the Los Angeles General Medical Center, she completed a general surgery internship in 1984 and a urology residency 1988. She conducted a urologic oncology fellowship under Donald G. Skinner at the USC Norris Comprehensive Cancer Center in 1990.

Skinner is a urologic oncologist, urologist, and urologic surgeon. From 1990 to 2012, she was a faculty member at the Keck School of Medicine of the University of Southern California. In May 2012, she became the chair of the department of urology at the Stanford University School of Medicine. She is an expert in bladder reconstruction and continent urinary diversion. She is the Thomas A. Stamey Research professor of urology.
