= Arthur W. Toga =

American neuroscientist

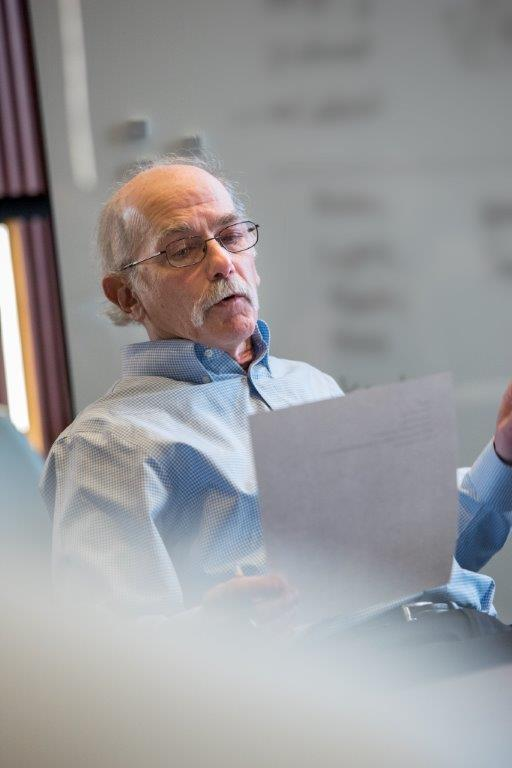
- Occupations: Director of the Laboratory of Neuro Imaging (LONI) and the Mark and Mary Stevens Neuroimaging and Informatics Institute
- Known for: Developed imaging techniques and large-scale, three-dimensional brain atlases to study Alzheimer's disease, Parkinson’s disease, and other neurological disorders

Academic background
- Education: University of Massachusetts Boston; Saint Louis University

Academic work
- Sub-discipline: Neuroimaging, Informatics, and Brain mapping
- Institutions: Washington University in St. Louis; UCLA; University of Southern California

Arthur W. Toga is an American neuroscientist and the director of the Laboratory of Neuro Imaging (LONI) and the Mark and Mary Stevens Neuroimaging and Informatics Institute within the Keck School of Medicine of the University of Southern California. He is also the Ghada Irani Chair in Neuroscience and provost professor of ophthalmology, neurology, psychiatry and the behavioral sciences, radiology and engineering.

He founded LONI in 1983 at the Washington University School of Medicine’s McDonnell Center for Higher Brain Function, and has done pioneering work on brain mapping and atlasing, global data sharing and neuroimaging informatics.

Toga has been repeatedly named one of "the world’s most influential scientific minds" and a highly cited researcher by Thomson Reuters and Clarivate.

== Academic career ==
=== Education ===
Toga received his Bachelor of Science in psychology from the University of Massachusetts Boston in Psychology (cum laude) in 1974. He obtained his Master of Science in Psychology/Neurosciences (cum laude) from Saint Louis University in 1976 and his PhD in Psychology/Neurosciences from Saint Louis University in 1978.

=== Professional career ===
Toga began a postdoctoral fellowship at the Washington University School of Medicine’s Department of Neurology in 1978. In 1980, he became a research assistant professor in neurology there, and launched the Laboratory of Neuro Imaging in 1983. He also had a secondary appointment in the Department of Computer Sciences at Washington University in St. Louis.

In 1987, Toga became an associate professor at UCLA. During his time at UCLA, Toga was the assistant chairman for research affairs for the Department of Neurology, director of LONI, and co-director of the Division of Brain Mapping within UCLA’s Neuropsychiatric Institute.

Toga was promoted to full professor in 1993 and university professor in 2009. He also received the honor of Distinguished Professor within the Department of Neurology in 2009. Toga served as the assistant dean for the David Geffen School of Medicine between 2008 and 2013, and as the vice chair in the Department of Neurology. He was also the David Geffen Chair in Informatics from 2010 to 2013 and the assistant vice provost of informatics from 2010 to 2012.

In 2013, Toga moved to the University of Southern California, where he was named director of LONI and the USC Mark and Mary Stevens Neuroimaging and Informatics Institute. At the Keck School of Medicine of USC he is also Provost Professor of Ophthalmology, Neurology, Psychiatry, Radiology and Biomedical Engineering. In 2016, he was named the Ghada Irani Chair in Neuroscience.

=== Research contributions ===
Toga's research has focused on neuroimaging, informatics, and brain mapping. He has developed imaging techniques and large-scale, three-dimensional brain atlases to study Alzheimer's disease, Parkinson’s disease, and other neurological disorders. He has participated in federally-funded research projects including the Alzheimer's Disease Neuroimaging Initiative (ADNI), the National Institutes of Health BRAIN Initiative, the Human Connectome Project, the Parkinson’s Progression Markers Initiative, the Image and Data Archive (IDA), and the Global Alzheimer’s Association Interactive Network.

Toga is the founding Editor-in-Chief of NeuroImage, an open-access journal of neuroimaging and informatics.

=== Influence outside neuroscience ===
Toga's work has been cited in the fields of sociology, utopian studies, applied philosophy, and law, and discussed in popular science magazines such as Scientific American Mind.

== Select publications ==
In addition to many research journal publications and book chapter contributions, Toga has co-authored and co-edited several books and reference works, including:

- Brain Warping (1998) ISBN 9780080525549
- The Rhesus Monkey Brain in Stereotaxic Coordinates (1999) ISBN 9780123582553
- Brain Mapping: The Systems (2000) ISBN 9780126925456
- Brain Mapping: The Disorders (2000) ISBN 9780124814608
- Brain Mapping: The Methods (2002) ISBN 9780126930191
- Brain Mapping – The Essentials: A Textbook of Neuroimaging (2014) ISBN 9780080921204

== Hostage Experience ==
Toga was aboard TWA flight 847 on June 14, 1985 when it was hijacked and taken, eventually, to Beirut, Lebanon. He was among hostages who appeared at a press conference to plead for a negotiated release. He was released on June 30 along with other hostages, and was greeted by then-Vice President George H. W. Bush.
