= Randal Haworth =

American plastic surgeon

Dr. Randal Haworth
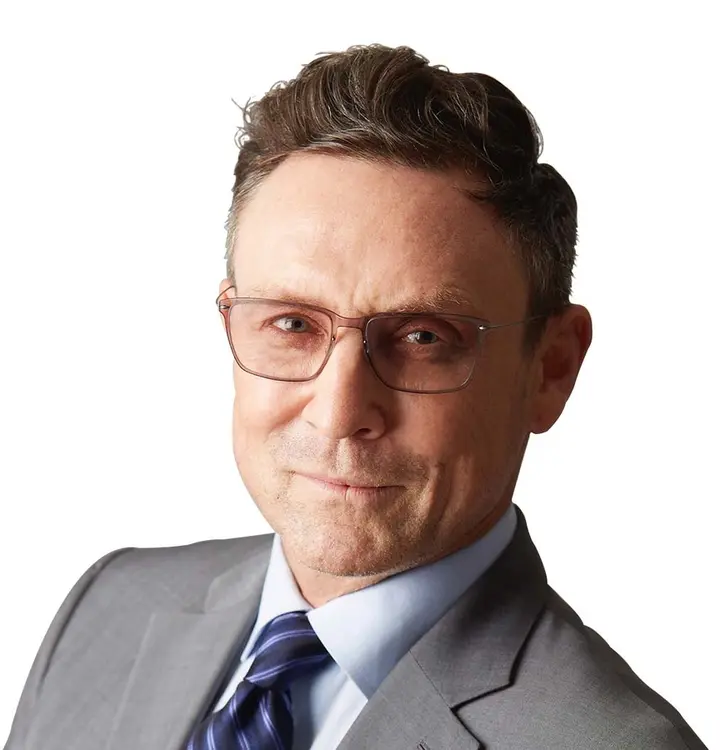
- Born: September 19, 1961 (age 64); Los Angeles, California
- Education: University of Southern California
- Occupation: Plastic Surgeon

Randal D. Haworth, (born September 19, 1961) is an American plastic surgeon recognized for his leading role in reality TV series The Swan. Haworth is also an artist.

== Early life ==
Haworth was born in Los Angeles as an only child.

== Education ==
Haworth graduated Alpha Omega Alpha from the University of Southern California School of Medicine in 1988. He then completed a five-year surgical residency at New York Hospital/ Cornell University Medical Center in 1993. Haworth served as Chief Resident during his plastic surgery residency at UCLA, where he gained extensive experience in the sub-specialties of aesthetic, micro-, pediatric, and hand surgery. During this time, he earned the title of Plastic Surgical Consultant of the Year for 1993–94. Upon completing his training, Haworth established his office and surgical center on Bedford Drive in Beverly Hills where he currently practices. Haworth is board certified by the American Board of Plastic Surgery, and a Fellow of the American College of Surgeons.

== Career ==
Haworth has published multiple articles in plastic and general surgical journals where he details technical advances in cosmetic surgery. A June 2004 publication in Plastic and Reconstructive Surgery, describes Haworth's innovations in permanent lip augmentation as well as the F.A.T.M.A. technique that he invented. Another article in Cosmetic Surgery Times details his experience in midface lifts utilizing the Endotine B midface device from Coapt. Among Haworth's areas of expertise are rhinoplasty (including revising previously operated upon noses that have been disfigured), facial rejuvenation and breast surgery.

The Swan television show centered on Haworth's ability to transform a very plain appearance into beautiful one, while maintaining a natural look. Haworth has been frequently profiled in print media, including Los Angeles Magazine, The New York Times, and The Wall Street Journal, as well as on television (Entertainment Tonight, Larry King, MSNBC). In 1998, Los Angeles magazine nominated him as one of L.A.'s top 8 plastic surgeons, while in 2005, LA Confidential magazine named him as one of the 2 best plastic surgeons in Los Angeles.

== Art ==
Haworth has exhibited his Iconography series of paintings in both Los Angeles and Boca Raton, Florida.

Haworth began hand-drawing medical illustrations for medical journal articles in 1981. He was inspired by master medical illustrator Max Broedel of Johns Hopkins University. His illustrations were published in multiple journals, including Plastic and Reconstructive Surgery, Annals of Plastic Surgery, Trauma Quarterly, and Hand Clinics.

Discipline

In August 2000, Haworth had his first solo art show entitled "Memories Lost" at the BGH Gallery/Bergamot Station in Santa Monica, California. The body of work comprised photorealistic drawings of missing children and adults.

Later, his series of rendered acrylic paintings entitled "Iconography" focused on reflecting modern culture through anachronistic figurative images. This show was staged at The James Gray Gallery in Santa Monica (August 2006), the Karen Lynne Gallery in Beverly Hills (November 2006), and Caesarea Gallery in Boca Raton, Florida (February 2007). Art critic Peter Frank called it 'anti-Pop Realism' stating that his art 'synthesizes classic style with Pop Surrealism.'"

== Filmography ==
- 20 Best and Worst Celebrity Plastic Surgery Stories (2009) (self)
- Porcelain (2008) (self)
- The Swan (2004–05) (self)
- Larry King Live (2005) (medical expert)
- On-Air with Ryan Seacrest (4 May 2004) (self)
- Anderson Cooper 360° (self) 2 April 2004 (2004)

== Publications ==
- Haworth RD: How to Achieve a Reliable Midface Lift. Cosmetic Surgery Times 8:8, 2005
- Haworth RD: Customizing Perioral Enhancement to Obtain Ideal Lip Aesthetics: Combining Both Lip Voluming and Reshaping Procedures Following an Algorithmic Approach . Plast Reconstr Surg 113:2182, 2004
- Rosenberg PH, Haworth RD, Heier L, et al.: The Role of the Cranial Base in Facial Growth; Experimental Craniofacial Synostosis in the Rabbit. Plast Reconstr Surg 99:1396, 1997
- Haworth RD: Dispelling Congenital Confusion. Parents 1:1 Dec 1995
- Munshi IA, Haworth RD, Barie PS: Resolution of Refractory Pancreatic Ascites Treated after Continuous Infusion of Octreotide Acetate. Pancreas. Int J Pancreatology 17:67 1995
- Leipziger LS, Schnapp DS, Haworth RD, et al.: Facial Skeletal Growth After Timed Soft Tissue Undermining. Plast Reconstr Surg 89: 809, 1992
- LaTrenta GS, Grant RT, Haworth RD, et al.: Functional Reconstruction for Severe Post-Burn Microstomia: A Case Report. Ann Plast Surg 29: 178, 1992
- Haworth RD, Rosenberg PH, Hoffman LA, et al.: The Anterior Microsurgical Approach to the Cranial Base in the Rabbit. Laboratory Animal 26: 196, 1992
