= Melvin B. Geliebter =

American businessman, political donor and philanthropist

- Occupation: Businessman
- Political party: Republican Party
- Spouse: Susan Geliebter

Melvin B. Geliebter is an American businessman, political donor and philanthropist.

== Career ==
Geliebter co-founded RSV Sport, a women's jeans manufacturer, with his wife. In 2002, they sold it to the Jones Apparel Group (now known as Nine West Holdings) for US$310 million. He later served as the chief executive officer of Sun Apparel.

Geliebter is the holder of three patents pertaining to jeans production.

== Political activity ==
Geliebter is a large donor to the Republican Party. He donated US$25,900 to Meg Whitman's gubernatorial campaign and US$2,400 to Carly Fiorina's senatorial campaign in 2010.

Additionally, he donated US$2,500 to Tom Leppert and US$5,000 to Boehner in 2011. The same year, he donated US$10,000 to Tim Pawlenty's presidential campaign in 2011. He donated US$30,600 to the National Republican Senatorial Committee in 2012. He also donated US$5,200 to Mimi Walters's congressional campaign in 2014.

== Philanthropy ==
Through the Geliebter Foundation, he donated between US$25,000 and US$49,999 to the USC Norris Comprehensive Cancer Center at the University of Southern California in 2006.

== Personal life ==
Geliebter has a wife, Susan. They reside in Beverly Park, a gated community in Los Angeles, California.
