= Robert F. Maronde =

American academic (1920–2008)

Robert Francis Maronde (January 13, 1920 – August 13, 2008) was a professor at the University of Southern California Medical School. He helped create an artificial kidney, and the first computerized pharmacy system in the 1960s.

== Early life and education ==
The son of a physician father, Maronde was born in Monterey Park, California, on January 13, 1920. He graduated from South Pasadena High School in 1937, received his bachelor's degree from the University of Southern California in 1941 and earned his medical degree from the University of Southern California School of Medicine in 1944. He was a ship's doctor in the United States Navy Medical Corps while on active duty in the Naval Reserve from 1946 to 1947.

== Career ==
In 1949, in collaboration with Helen Martin, Maronde implemented a hemodialysis program for acute renal failure at what is now Los Angeles County-USC Medical Center. With their creation of an artificial kidney—it used a stainless-steel beer keg as a reservoir—they were at the forefront of medical innovation.

In the late 1960s, Maronde developed one of the first—if not the first—computerized prescription drug systems, which was launched in the outpatient pharmacy at County-USC.

== Personal life ==
Maronde had four children.
