= Steven Kahn (endocrinologist) =

South African professor

- Born: 1955 (age 70–71)
- Education: University of Cape Town
- Scientific career
- Fields: Endocrinology; Diabetes
- Workplaces: Einstein Medical Center; University of Washington
- Website: Steven Kahn, MB, ChB

Steven Emanuel Kahn (born 1955) is Professor of Medicine at the University of Washington and at the VA Puget Sound Health Care System. He is also Director of the University of Washington Diabetes Research Center and Director of the Diabetes Research Group at VA Puget Sound Health Care System.

Born in Durban, South Africa, he received a medical degree from the University of Cape Town in 1978. He took up a position at the Einstein Medical Center in Philadelphia in 1983, prior to joining the University of Washington School of Medicine as a postdoctoral research fellow in endocrinology.

He is currently Editor in Chief of Diabetes Care.

He is a recipient of the Endocrine Society Clinical Investigator Award, the Department of Veterans Affairs John B. Barnwell Award, the European Association for the Study of Diabetes Albert Renold Award, and the American Diabetes Association Outstanding Achievement in Clinical Diabetes Research Award. He has an h-index of 146 according to Google Scholar.

In June 2026, Kahn and fellow endocrinologists were ejected from annual meeting of American Diabetes Association (ADA), after they handing printed copies of a editorial first authored by him and published in Diabetes Care in April. According ADA, Kahn, Desmond Schatz, Aaron Kelly, Justin Ryder and Irl Hirsch were removed by security staff and police officers because they violated de code of conduct for conferences.
