= Jian-Min Yuan (physicist) =

Taiwanese physicist

Jian-Min Yuan (born 1944) is a Taiwanese physicist.

Yuan studied chemistry at National Taiwan University, completing a bachelor's degree in 1966, followed by a master's degree in 1968. He then obtained a doctorate in chemical physics at the University of Chicago in 1973. Yuan began teaching at Drexel University in 1978, as an assistant professor. He was promoted to associate professor in 1984, and appointed a full professor in 1991. Yuan was elected a fellow of the American Physical Society in 1998, "[f]or the application of nonlinear dynamics and chaos theory to the understanding of atomic and molecular processes, particularly laser-induced molecular dissociation and ionization."
