= Alzheimer's Disease Cooperative Study =

The Alzheimer's Disease Cooperative Study (ADCS) was founded at University of California San Diego in 1991 and coordinates clinical trials of candidate treatments for Alzheimer's disease.

It is funded by the National Institutes of Health as well as companies that develop drugs. The center has coordinated important clinical trials on AD drugs like solanezumab.

== History ==
As of 2008, 75 research sites in the United States and Canada were part of the consortium. Leon Thal served as director until February 2007, when he died; Paul Aisen was recruited to succeed him.

In 2006, the NIH awarded $52 million to ADCS to fund 6 years of further clinical trials.

In 2013 Eli Lilly committed to spending $76.6 million on clinical trials through the center.

Aisen left UCSD in 2015 because he was unhappy with the level of support that UCSD was providing him and due to USC's offer. UCSD and USC ended up in litigation over control of the ADCS and its research data, which at that time involved six ongoing clinical trials and data collected on thousands of clinical trial subjects. Part of the dispute arose because Aisen's lab had uploaded the data from the ADCS onto Amazon Cloud servers and would not give the passwords to UCSD officials. Some aspects of data management were temporarily settled in 2016; as of 2017 the litigation was ongoing. The lawsuit was settled in 2019.
