= Jian-Min Yuan (epidemiologist) =

Chinese epidemiologist and cancer researcher

Jian-Min Yuan is an epidemiologist and cancer researcher.

Yuan earned a medical degree and completed a master's degree in public health specializing in epidemiology at Shanghai Medical University in 1983 and 1986, respectively, then served as a research fellow at the Shanghai Cancer Institute and also taught as an assistant professor there before pursuing doctoral studies in epidemiology at the University of Southern California, which he completed in 1996. Yuan was a postdoctoral researcher at the Keck School of Medicine until 1999. He remained at USC in an assistant professorship until 2005, when he joined the University of Minnesota faculty as an associate professor. Yuan was appointed a full professor in 2010. He joined the University of Pittsburgh Cancer Institute as associate director and Co-Leader of the Cancer Epidemiology and Prevention Program in 2011. Yuan started teaching at the University of Pittsburgh as a visiting professor, was offered tenure in 2012, and became the Arnold Palmer Endowed Chair in Cancer Prevention in 2013.
