= Eila Kivikk'aho =

Finnish poet

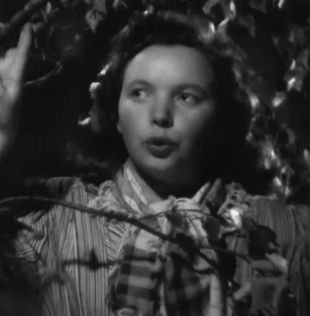
Eila Kivikk’aho in 1940.

Eila Sylvia Sammalkorpi (née Lamberg; 8 February 1921 – 21 June 2004), known by her pseudonym Eila Kivikk’aho, was a Finnish poet.

Kivikk’aho was born in Sortavala soon after the World War I. One of her most famous poems is "Nocturno", which was already published in the debut work Sinikallio (1942).

Kivikk’aho was awarded the State Prize for Literature in 1951, 1961, 1971 and 1976. She also received the Eino Leino Prize in 1976 and the Aleksis Kivi Prize in 1981.

As a translator to Finnish, Kivikk’aho was awarded the State Prize for Translation in 1970 and 1979. She died in Helsinki at the age of 83.

== Publications ==
- Sinikallio (1942; poems)
- Viuhkalaulu (1945; poems)
- Niityltä pois (1951; poems)
- Venelaulu (1952; poems)
- Parvi (1961; poems)
- Ruusukvartsi (1995; poems)
- Kootut runot (2001; collection, with an article by Eila Pennanen)
