= Amytis Towfighi =

Amytis "Amy" Towfighi is American professor of Neurology, Director of Neurological Services and Innovation for Los Angeles County Department of Health Services and Chief of Neurology and Associate Medical Director of Neurological Services at LAC+USC Medical Center.

== Education and career ==
Towfighi received her B.S. degree from Massachusetts Institute of Technology, an M.D. from Johns Hopkins University, and completed her internship at Massachusetts General Hospital (MGH) and residency at the Harvard Partners Neurology Program (Massachusetts General Hospital and Brigham and Women's Hospital). She also completed her fellowship in Vascular Neurology at University of California, Los Angeles and currently is a faculty member at Keck School of Medicine of USC.

She also works at the Los Angeles County Department of Health Services and the Southern California Clinical and Translational Science Institute where she writes articles regarding sex, race, ethnic, and socioeconomic differences in stroke patients. She has completed several clinical trials testing health system approaches to helping patients with stroke reduce the risk of another stroke. Her key interest is to reduce disparities in healthcare access, healthcare services and clinical outcomes for vulnerable populations, including minorities, the socioeconomically disadvantaged, and others with poor access to care.

Towfighi is a recipient of the American Academy of Neurology's Michael S. Pessin Stroke Leadership Prize and the American Heart Association's Robert G. Siekert New Investigator in Stroke, and is a fellow of the American Heart Association's Stroke Council. She was the Chair of the American Heart Association Writing Committee's Scientific Statement on Post-Stroke Depression and has co-written other guidelines and scientific statements for the American Heart Association.
