= Tracey D. Brown =

American businessperson

- Born: Tracey Brown
- Education: Columbia University (MBA)
- Occupation: Businessperson

Tracey D. Brown is an American businesswoman. She was the CEO of the American Diabetes Association until 2021, when she left to become President of Retail Products and Chief Customer Officer at Walgreens. She was the first ADA CEO to have been diagnosed with type 2 diabetes.

== Early life and education ==
Brown trained as a chemical engineer at the University of Delaware and has an MBA from Columbia University.

== Career ==
Early in her career, she held leadership positions at American Express, Proctor & Gamble, and Exxon Mobil. Brown was Chief Operating Officer for the direct marketing agency Direct Impact, CEO and managing director of RAPP Dallas from April 2008 to September 2014, and with Sam’s Club as a senior vice president from February 2017 to June 2018. Brown was the CEO of the American Diabetes Association from May 2018 to October 6, 2021. She was their first CEO to have been diagnosed with type 2 diabetes. Before becoming CEO, she had served on the ADA Board of Directors.

In October 2021, she became President of Retail Products and Chief Customer Officer at Walgreens. She serves on the Board of Directors for Weight Watchers and Yeti. She was named one of Savoy Magazine's Most Influential Black Corporate Directors in 2021.

== Personal life and health ==
Brown developed gestational diabetes while pregnant with her daughter, which later developed into type 2 diabetes. Brown said in an interview that she didn't take her disease seriously for the first five years after the diagnosis, but her five-year-old daughter convinced her to take action.

As of 2021, Brown resides in Washington, D.C.

== Publications ==
- "Time to bridge the gap, demand diabetes care equity". Boston Herald. 8 January 2021.
