= Joshua H. Ritchie =

American rabbi (born 1938)

Joshua H. Ritchie (born 1938) is an American-Israeli haredi Rabbi, counselor and medical doctor. He is the founder and director of the Refuah Institute in Jerusalem, a non-profit orthodox-Jewish center which provides training in therapy techniques, life-coaching, marriage and youth counselling based within the Jewish halacha.

== Medical and counselling career ==
Ritchie studied medicine at the University of California, San Francisco, becoming an MD in 1962. In the late 1960s and 1970s, he worked as a doctor and lecturer in Israel and California, specializing in pediatrics and family medicine. In the early 1990s he was an assistant professor at the Albert Einstein College of Medicine and director of pediatric training at the University of Southern California School of Medicine.

In the 1980s he worked at the Edgemont Psychiatric Hospital in Los Angeles, founding the non-profit Refuah Institute in New York in 1994.

In 2001 the Refuah Institute moved its center of activity to Jerusalem, where Ritchie also helped establish an English-speaking crisis hotline, the Milev Center.

== Rabbinical training ==
Ritchie received his rabbinical training from Rabbi Shlomo Carlebach, becoming a disciple of the Amshinov Rabbi. He was ordained in 1990.
