= Keck Hospital of USC =

Coordinates: 34.062362°N 118.202147°W

- Water fountain at Keck Hospital of USC

Geography
- Location: Los Angeles, California, United States

Organization
- Care system: Private
- Type: Teaching
- Affiliated university: Keck School of Medicine of USC

Services
- Beds: 401

History
- Founded: 1991

Links
- Website: keckmedicine.org
- Lists: Hospitals in California

The Keck Hospital of USC, formerly USC University Hospital, is a private 401–licensed bed teaching hospital of the University of Southern California (USC). The hospital is part of the USC Keck School of Medicine, it is located on the USC Health Sciences Campus, which is adjacent to the Los Angeles General Medical Center, east of Downtown Los Angeles.

In 2019, the Keck Hospital of USC was ranked by U.S. News & World Report as the 18th-best hospital out of more than 6,000 medical centers in the United States, and fifth on the West Coast (after the UCLA Ronald Reagan Medical Center, Cedars-Sinai Medical Center, UCSF Medical Center, and Stanford University Medical Center).

The Keck Medical Center of USC includes two acute care hospitals: 401-licensed bed Keck Hospital of USC and 60-licensed bed USC Norris Cancer Hospital; two community hospitals: USC Verdugo Hills Hospital and USC Arcadia Hospital, and four outpatient healthcare clinics . Under the Keck Medicine of USC banner there are two community hospitals, USC Verdugo Hills Hospital located in the city of Glendale. and USC Arcadia Hospital located in the city of Arcadia.

== History ==
The hospital was started in 1991 by National Medical Enterprises (later renamed Tenet Healthcare). While Tenet had ownership of the hospital it was staffed by doctors from the Keck School Of Medicine. In 2006, USC sued Tenet to end the agreement. Three years later in 2009, Tenet Healthcare sold the hospital and USC Norris Cancer Hospital to USC for $275 million, which then allowed USC to fully integrate the hospitals under the "Keck Medicine of USC" branding. Eddie Money (musician) died of complications from the cancer at Keck Hospital of USC in Los Angeles on September 13, 2019, at age 70.[35][11][44][45] A year later, his family filed a lawsuit alleging wrongful death against the hospital, with an additional allegation of medical malpractice.[45] The case was settled out of court in 2023.[46]
