= Marshall B. Ketchum University =

Private university in Fullerton, California, US

- Former name: Southern California College of Optometry
- Type: Private, non-profit
- Established: 1904; 122 years ago
- Endowment: $23.5 million (2020)
- President: Julie Schornack
- Location: Fullerton, California, United States; 33°53′22″N 117°53′10″W
- Colors: Purple & Gold
- Website: www.ketchum.edu

Marshall B. Ketchum University is a private university focused on graduate programs in healthcare and located in Fullerton, California. MBKU expanded from the Southern California College of Optometry which was founded in 1904. The university was officially established as a multidisciplinary university with the addition of School of PA Studies in 2011 and College of Pharmacy in 2013. Along with Hope International University, the campus bookends the north and south sides of the Cal State Fullerton campus respectively.

The university's clinical and teaching facility is known as Ketchum Health. The facility provides patient care for optometry in the University Eye Center in Anaheim and Los Angeles. It also provides patient care in internal medicine and Family Medicine in Anaheim.

== History ==
Marshall B. Ketchum, MD, founded the Los Angeles Medical School of Ophthalmology and Optometry in March 1904, in downtown Los Angeles, CA. In 1906, the name was changed to the Los Angeles Optical College and Post Graduate School of Opticians. In 1909, the school affiliated with the Southern California Eye College and became the Southern California College of Optometry and Ophthalmology. At the time, two degrees were conferred by the school, Doctor of Optometry for a six-month term ($75 tuition) and a Doctor of Ophthalmology and Optometry for an eight-month term ($100 tuition). During the early 1920s, the faculty worked to develop a standard curriculum and expanded the program to two years. In 1930, the school became affiliated with the University of Southern California (USC). During this time, there were debates about scope of practice, the program's curriculum and degree earned, and optometry licensing. In 1933, the school split from USC and once again became the Los Angeles School of Optometry. The school began a rebuilding phase after the split from USC by strengthening its curriculum and building a program for Optometric Assistants (which wasn't successfully implemented until 1973). After WWII, a flood of applicants forced class sizes to increase and administration to look for a larger campus. In 1948, the school became the Los Angeles College of Optometry and moved to a larger campus at 950 West Jefferson in Los Angeles, CA. After many years of growth and development, the search for a larger campus resulted in developing a new Fullerton campus in the early 1970s. During this time the college also underwent a name change to Southern California College of Optometry in 1972. The college moved to 2575 Yorba Linda Blvd., Fullerton, in 1973.

MBKU President Kevin L. Alexander, OD, PhD, started at SCCO in 2008.

The PA program was first established in 2012, and the first matriculating class began in Fall 2014. With this new addition, Marshall B. Ketchum University officially became the home of both the Southern California College of Optometry (SCCO) and School of PA Studies (SPAS) on July 1, 2013. The university was named after the founder of the optometric institution, Marshall B. Ketchum. The College of Pharmacy at Marshall B. Ketchum University was established in 2014.

=== Name changes ===
- 1904 – Los Angeles Medical School of Ophthalmology and Optometry
- 1906 – Los Angeles Optical College and Post Graduate School of Opticians
- 1909 – Southern California College of Optometry and Ophthalmology
- 1911 – Los Angeles Medical School of Ophthalmology and Optometry
- 1922 – Los Angeles School of Optometry
- 1930 – The School became an affiliated program at USC under the Department of Physics-Optics
- 1933 – Los Angeles School of Optometry
- 1948 – Los Angeles College of Optometry
- 1972 – Southern California College of Optometry
- 2013 – Marshall B. Ketchum University

== Academics ==
=== Accreditations ===
- Marshall B. Ketchum University: Western Association of Schools and Colleges (WASC).
- Southern California College of Optometry: Accreditation Council on Optometric Education (ACOE) of the American Optometric Association (AOA).
- School of PA Studies: The ARC-PA has granted Accreditation – Continued status to the School of Physician Assistant Studies sponsored by Marshall B. Ketchum University.
- College of Pharmacy: Marshall B. Ketchum University College of Pharmacy's Doctor of Pharmacy program has been granted Precandidate status by the Accreditation Council for Pharmacy Education.

=== Southern California College of Optometry ===
Established in 1904, SCCO is one of the oldest optometry schools in the U.S. The Southern California College of Optometry (SCCO) is a 4-year post-baccalaureate program leading to the degree, Doctor of Optometry (OD), accredited by Accreditation Council on Optometric Education (ACOE) of the American Optometric Association. During the first year, students spend most of their time in lectures and labs learning basic sciences (including optics, biomedical sciences, and visual sciences) and introductory clinical procedures. Throughout the year, first-year students will have observation hours in clinic as an introduction to patient care. During the second year, students will have more advanced lectures in visual science and spend time learning and perfecting clinical procedures. Students will slowly be eased into seeing patients at Ketchum Health in order to prepare them for clinic third and fourth year. Third-year students spend half their time in lecture and the other half in patient care under the supervision of clinical faculty. Lecture topics are more advanced, including courses in contact lenses, vision therapy, diseases of the eye, ocular pharmacology, clinical optometry and public health. The final year (fourth year) consists of four 3-month rotations as part of the Outreach Clinical Program. One clinical rotation is in specialty services at Ketchum Health and the other three rotations are at various off-site clinics. Students can choose from over 80 clinic sites in the U.S. and abroad.

The degree Doctor of Optometry will be awarded to students who satisfactorily complete the four-year academic and professional curriculum in optometry. Upon successful completion of the SCCO program and the NBEO examinations, graduates can apply for licensure in the U.S. or Canada.

=== School of PA Studies ===
The School of PA Studies at Marshall B. Ketchum University is a 27-month post-baccalaureate program leading to the degree, Master of Medical Science (MMS). Physician Assistants (PAs) are health care professionals licensed to practice medicine on a team under the supervision of physicians and surgeons. As part of their comprehensive responsibilities, PAs conduct physical exams, diagnose and treat illnesses, order and interpret tests, counsel on preventive health care and assist in surgery. The ARC-PA has granted Accreditation – Continued status to the School of Physician Assistant Studies sponsored by Marshall B. Ketchum University.

The inaugural PA class began the program in fall 2014 with 28 students enrolled. The first year (didactic year) curriculum consists of lecture and workshops focusing on applied medical sciences, pharmacotherapeautics, clinical medicine, medical professional ethics and more. During the first year, students will have supervised patient care experiences. The second year focuses on direct patient care in a variety of health care settings. Students experience twelve 6-week clinical rotations during the year, offering diverse clinical experiences. In addition to completing the rotations, students must also complete the Master's Capstone Project in order to graduate.

Upon successfully graduating, students must pass the Physician Assistant National Certifying Exam (PANCE), a computer-based, multiple choice test, in order to become a certified PA. Successful completion of PANCE is required to apply for PA state licensure. The Class of 2016 in the School of PA Studies achieved a first-time PANCE pass rate of 100%.

=== College of Pharmacy ===
The College of Pharmacy was established in 2014. The inaugural Class of 2020 began in the Fall 2016. The College of Pharmacy at Marshall B. Ketchum University is a 4-year post-baccalaureate program leading to the degree Doctor of Pharmacy (PharmD). Some of the primary goals for the College of Pharmacy are to foster interprofessional education and clinical practice experiences among all students throughout the different health programs. By providing a comprehensive curriculum, the university hopes to prepare their students for licensure and practice upon graduation. In addition, the university's vision is to encourage students to acknowledge the role and value of the profession of pharmacy through leadership opportunities.

The degree Doctor of Pharmacy (PharmD) will be awarded to students who satisfactorily complete the curriculum. Upon completion of the program, graduates will then qualify to sit for the examinations to obtain a license. There are two examinations: the North American Pharmacist Licensure Exam (NAPLEX) and the Multistate Pharmacy Jurisprudence Exam (MPJE), which is a state specific test that currently 48 states require as a component of licensure.

In 2021, Marshall B. Ketchum University College of Pharmacy's Doctor of Pharmacy program has been granted Full Accreditation status by the Accreditation Council for Pharmacy Education.

=== Master of Science in Vision Science ===
The Master of Science (MS) in vision science is a research-based graduate degree that emphasizes hypothesis-driven research and the development of analytical skills in experimental optometry and vision science. At the university, students interested in the Master's program often pursue a combined OD /MS degree. Other options include MS Traditional, MS Residency, and MS Part-time. The Master's program requires completion of a minimum of 60 quarter-hours of graduate credit, a cumulative graduate grade point average of at least 3.00, completion of the Master's research requirement, successful defense of the MS thesis, and submission of a final bound copy of the thesis.

=== Optometry Residencies ===
Although not required to practice optometry, residencies are great options for newly graduated optometrists to polish clinical skills and specialize in specific areas of optometry. Optometry residencies are planned program of post-OD clinical education that are designed to advance significantly the optometric graduate's preparation as a provider of patient care services beyond entry level practice. Residency programs are a minimum of 12 months and include a well-designed mix of self-directed learning, seminar participation, instructional experiences, and scholarship.

SCCO began its postdoctoral residency program in 1977, with its first residency program in Vision Therapy. The program has expanded to include: Cornea & Contact Lenses, Low Vision Rehabilitation, Ocular Disease, Primary Care, or Pediatric Optometry/Vision Therapy. SCCO offers 22 residency programs with 47 residency positions in six states including California, Arizona, Nevada, New Mexico, Washington and Utah.

== Patient centers ==
=== Anaheim and Los Angeles ===
There are two clinical teaching facilities affiliated with the Southern California College of Optometry at Marshall B. Ketchum University. The University Eye Center at Ketchum Health Anaheim is located at 5460 E. La Palma Ave. in Anaheim. The University Eye Center at Ketchum Health Los Angeles is located at 3916 S. Broadway in Los Angeles. Both facilities are large patient care centers that offer services in primary eye care, contact lenses, pediatric vision care, vision therapy, ocular disease, low vision and dry eyes. In addition to eye care services, there are also optical services departments where opticians assist in selecting and/or adjusting eyewear. They are open six days a week and accept major vision insurance as well as major medical insurances.

=== Ketchum Health ===
On January 23, 2015, Dr. Alexander announced the acquisition of the new building in Anaheim, CA, that is now the home of the University Eye Center, and allows for the future expansion of primary health care services and pharmacy. The name of the new facility, Ketchum Health, is dedicated to the university founder Dr. Marshall B. Ketchum. Due to the addition of the PA program in 2014, and the pharmacy program in 2016, this expansion of clinical space was necessary for the growing university. It will be a place where interprofessional clinical training can take place, as well as team-based patient care. On June 15, 2015, over one hundred guests attended the ground breaking ceremony that marked the beginning of renovation for Ketchum Health. The University Eye Center at Ketchum Health, as the first phase of interprofessional health care center, opened its doors at the new location May 31, 2016.
