= Diabetes Care =

- Discipline: Diabetes
- Language: English
- Edited by: Steven Kahn

Publication details
- History: 1978–present
- Publisher: American Diabetes Association (United States)
- Frequency: Monthly
- Impact factor: 16.2 (2022)

Standard abbreviations
- ISO 4: Diabetes Care

Indexing
- ISSN: 0149-5992 (print); 1935-5548 (web)
- OCLC no.: 60638990

Links
- Journal homepage

Diabetes Care is a monthly peer-reviewed medical journal published since 1978 by the American Diabetes Association. The journal covers research in five categories:

- clinical care/education/nutrition/psychosocial research,
- epidemiology/health services research,
- emerging treatments and technologies,
- pathophysiology/complications,
- cardiovascular and metabolic risk.

The journal also publishes clinically relevant review articles, letters to the editor, and commentaries.

The current Editor-in-Chief is Steven Kahn.

The journal has a 2022 impact factor of 16.2. The 2023 impact factor was 14.8, ranking 6th of 187 in journals of endocrinology/metabolism.

== See also ==
- Diabetes – another journal published by the American Diabetes Association
- Tai's model – a controversial paper published in Diabetes Care
