= Rene Cailliet =

American physician

Rene Cailliet, M.D., (June 10, 1917 – March 14, 2015) was an American physician of French ancestry best known for a very popular series of books on musculoskeletal medicine.

== Personal life ==
Rene Cailliet was born in Philadelphia on June 10, 1917. He was the son of Lucien Cailliet (May 27, 1897 – January 3, 1985), the French born American composer, conductor, arranger, clarinetist, and creator of music for films. After graduation from Medical School at the University of Southern California in 1943, he served in the U.S. Army during the Second World War. After the war he was one of the pioneering physicians who developed Physical Medicine and Rehabilitation as a specialization.

== Career ==
In 1953 he was one of the founding partners of the Southern California Permanente Medical Group and practiced in the Departments of Physical Medicine and Rehabilitation at the Kaiser Permanente Los Angeles and West Los Angeles Medical Centers.

== Retirement ==
After his retirement in 1974, he served as a chairman of the Department of Physical Medicine and Rehabilitation at the University of Southern California. He was in private practice at Santa Monica Hospital for several years and was an emeritus professor of Physical Medicine and Rehabilitation at the David Geffen School of Medicine at UCLA at the time of his death.

Cailliet resided near Los Angeles, California.

== Selected works ==
- Whiplash-Associated Diseases. American Medical Association (2007) ISBN 978-1-57947-774-5
- The Illustrated Guide to Functional Anatomy of the Musculoskeletal System. American Medical Association (2003) ISBN 1-57947-408-X
- Pain: Mechanisms and Management. F.A. Davis & Co (1993) ISBN 978-0-8036-1635-6
- Knee Pain and Disability (Pain Series). F.A. Davis & Co (1992) ISBN 978-0-8036-1622-6
- Shoulder Pain (Pain Series). F.A. Davis & Co (1991) ISBN 978-0-8036-1614-1
- Neck and Arm Pain (Pain Series). F.A. Davis & Co (1991) ISBN 978-0-8036-1610-3
- Soft Tissue Pain and Disability (Pain Series). F.A. Davis & Co (1988) ISBN 0-8036-1631-7
- Low Back Syndrome. F.A. Davis & Co (1982) ASIN B000HF9AVI
