= National Diabetes Education Program =

American medical education organization

NDEP logo

National Diabetes Education Program (NDEP) was started by the NIH and CDC in 1997 to educate the public about the risks of diabetes. NDEP's goal was to reduce the illness and death caused by diabetes and its complications. To help meet this goal, NDEP provided free diabetes education information to the public. NDEP ended in 2019.
