= USC Norris Comprehensive Cancer Center =

USC Norris Comprehensive Cancer Center and Hospital
- Keck Medical Center of USC
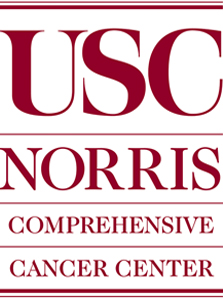

- The Norris Cancer Hospital at USC's Health Science Campus is composed of three buildings: Ezralow Research Tower - NCH (Left), Topping Tower - NTT (Center), and the Harlyne J. Norris Cancer Research Tower - NRT (Right)

Geography
- Location: 1441 Eastlake Ave., Los Angeles, California, United States

Organization
- Care system: Private
- Affiliated university: Keck School of Medicine of the University of Southern California

Services
- Beds: 60 as of 2009

History
- Founded: 1973, Comprehensive Cancer Research Center; 1983, Hospital

Links
- Website: uscnorriscancer.usc.edu
- Lists: Hospitals in California

The USC Norris Comprehensive Cancer Center is a cancer center in Los Angeles, California owned and operated by the University of Southern California (USC) through its Keck School of Medicine. It was one of the first eight comprehensive cancer centers in the United States, which is devoted to patient care, prevention, research, and education.

== History ==
In 1971, the U.S. Congress passed the National Cancer Act (see War on cancer), which led the Dean of the School of Medicine, Dr. Franz K. Bauer, to begin the effort to develop a comprehensive cancer center at USC. He recruited Dr. G. Denman Hammond of Children's Hospital Los Angeles to serve as the founding director to lead the effort. After the completion of the Norris hospital, Dr. Hammond resigned from his directorship shortly before its opening and returned to practicing pediatric medicine.

Dr. Brian Henderson served as the director from 1983 to 1993. He was succeeded by Peter Jones, a prominent researcher, who led as director from 1993 to 2010. Following Jones, Dr. Stephen Gruber took the helm in 2011 until 2019. Caryn Lerman held the position of director, having been appointed in 2019. In 2025, Lerman announced she would be stepping down from her position. In November 2026, Anthony El-khoueiry, MD was announced as the new director of Norris.

== Research ==
The Norris cancer center is a composed of faculty and practitioners at the hospital and as other institutions. This includes:

- USC Alfred E. Mann School of Pharmacy and Pharmaceutical Sciences
- USC Center for Economic and Social Research (CESR)
- USC Center for Genetic Epidemiology
- USC Center for Health Equity in the Americas
- USC Davis School of Gerontology
- USC Department of Population and Public Health Sciences
- USC Michelson Center Convergent Science Institute in Cancer
- USC Viterbi School of Engineering
- Children's Hospital Los Angeles
- NYU Grossman School of Medicine

Some notable researchers and providers include, Pinchas Cohen, Eileen M. Crimmins, Stacey Finley, Scott E. Fraser, Indy Gill, Steve A. Kay, and Valter Longo.

== Norris Cancer Hospital ==
Originally, the plan included a joint effort between USC and Los Angeles County (LAC) to build the center on county property near the Health Science Campus. The County Board of Supervisors initially agreed to what was projected to be 37 million to construct a new building, whereby the County supports half of the total from their general fund.

From that initial agreement with LAC, Dr. Hammond applied for federal funding, whereby USC received 11.8 million, and USC would fundraise the remaining 6.7 million dollars through private donations. However, in August 1976, the County Board of Supervisors rescinded their initial support from the project. The Board decided that the 18 million dollars from the county would be left to public vote in the November 1976 general election. In an effort to gain public support, USC recruited John Wayne for a public service announcement for Los Angeles radio. On November 2, County Measure C - Los Angeles County Bond Proposition failed, with a 56.6% approval rate by voters, needing 66.7% to pass. The hospital was downsized to a 20 million dollar project and relocated to HSC property, opening in 1983. Kenneth True Norris Jr. provided the money to build the hospital after voters rejected a bond offering proposed by USC and Los Angeles County.

Tenet Healthcare acquired the center in 2003 and sold it, along with Keck Hospital of USC, to USC in 2009 for $275 million after three years of litigation between the parties.

== Philanthropic Endowment and Support ==
In 2006, Melvin B. Geliebter donated between $25,000 and $49,999 to the USC Norris Comprehensive Cancer.

In September 2015, film producer Nancy Bernstein supported the Call to Cure Fund at Norris.

In October 2015, Norris hosted a black-tie gala fundraiser at the Beverly Wilshire Hotel. Hosted by Dana Carvey, celebrity guests included Pierce Brosnan, Fran Drescher, Joe Piscopo, and David Spade.

In Fall 2023, Norris received a grant from The Ralph Lauren Corporate Foundation (RLCF) to launch a Ralph Lauren Center for Cancer Prevention. This award is part of a $25 million overall commitment by the foundation to reduce cancer health disparities in underserved communities.
