= American Diabetes Association =

U.S.-based nonprofit organization

- Founded: 1939; 87 years ago
- Type: Nonprofit
- Tax ID no.: 13-1623888
- Purpose: Diabetes advocacy Research
- Location: 2451 Crystal Drive, Suite 900, Crystal City, Virginia, U.S.
- Website: www.diabetes.org

The American Diabetes Association (ADA) is a United States–based nonprofit that seeks to educate the public about diabetes and to help those affected by it through funding research to manage, cure and prevent diabetes, including type 1 diabetes, type 2 diabetes, gestational diabetes, and pre-diabetes. It is a network of 565,000 volunteers which includes 20,000 healthcare professionals and administration staff members.

== History ==
The ADA was formally founded in 1939. It was founded by six physicians, including Herman O. Mosenthal, Joseph T. Beardwood Jr., Joseph H. Barach, Henry J. John, and E. S. Dillion, at the 1939 annual meeting of the American College of Physicians.

== Activities ==
=== Conference ===
Each year the ADA hosts Scientific Sessions, a meeting for diabetes professionals. Thousands of healthcare providers and researchers attend the meeting.

At the 2026 conference, Rick Woychik, senior adviser to Jay Bhattacharya at the NIH, supported the Make America Healthy Again (MAHA) agenda and said that NIH staff were fired and research funding for diabetes was cut because "things are changing". During his keynote speech, the organization ejected five attendees for distributing copies of an article about funding cuts to diabetes research that had been published in the ADA's flagship medical journal, Diabetes Care, saying that conference attendees were required to "conduct themselves in a professional and respectful manner" and that handing out reprints of the article was "behavior not consistent with this code of conduct", possibly because event organizers interpreted sharing copies to be a form of protesting the funding cuts. Among those ejected were endocrinologist Steven E. Kahn, the lead author of the article and the editor-in-chief of the journal. It was seen by some to be "politically motivated suppression".

=== Funded research ===
The ADA aims to give individuals with diabetes access to the care they need to optimize their health. To work towards achieving this mission, the organization places effort into funding research projects that help minority groups navigate diabetes. The ADA works with various colleges, local governments, and companies to promote healthy lifestyles. They also fund research looking to control risk factors associated with diabetes, as seen in a recently published article discussing the role of microglia immune cells in diet-induced obesity.

== Finances ==
The Charity Navigator previously gave the ADA a 3-star overall rating, a 1-star financial rating and a 4-star accountability and transparency rating. As of August 2024, the rating had been upgraded to four stars, the highest available. As of 2026, ADA spends $18 to raise every $100, earning an A− rating from Charity Watch.

In the early 2000s, the ADA struck a three-year, $1.5 million sponsorship deal with Cadbury-Schweppes, the world's largest confectioner with products including Diet-Rite sodas, Snapple and Mott's Apple Sauce. According to a 2006 New York Times article, "critics say the A.D.A. affiliation has helped the candy maker pose as a concerned corporate citizen, even as it supplies grocery stores with sugary and fattening foods like Dr Pepper and the Cadbury Creme Egg." The article goes on to say, "The A.D.A. began rethinking how it raises money from companies, especially from those whose primary business is selling foods and beverages that are high in calories, even if they have created some sugar free items. The group has allowed some food company deals to expire and has turned down millions of dollars in new sponsorships."

The organization spends significant amounts on telemarketers including a contract with InfoCision, where telemarketers were instructed to lie to prospective donors that more of their donation was going toward the ADA than reality.

== Pay-to-play lawsuit ==
In 2023, Elizabeth Hanna, ex-chief nutritionist of the ADA, filed a whistleblower lawsuit claiming that the organisation accepted corporate money in exchange for recommending recipes that could harm people with diabetes. Hanna alleged that she was fired for refusing to endorse high amounts of Splenda in salads; ADA's scientific journal indicated that artificial sweeteners may raise the risk of type-2 diabetes.

== See also ==
- Banting Lectures
- Diabetes UK
- Diabetes Australia-NSW
- Centers for Disease Control
- National Diabetes Education Program
- NIDDK
- Tracey D. Brown
