= Alessandra Facchinetti =

Italian fashion designer (born 1972)

- Born: 2 June 1972 (age 54); Bergamo, Italy
- Education: Istituto Marangoni
- Occupation: fashion designer
- Labels: Gucci (2004－2005); Valentino (2008－2010); Tod's (2013－2016)

Alessandra Facchinetti (born 2 June 1972) is an Italian fashion designer who is known for her work as creative director at Gucci (2004–2005), Valentino (2008–2010) and Tod's (2013–2016).

== Early life ==
Facchinetti is the daughter of singer and keyboard player Roby Facchinetti, a member of the Italian group Pooh. Her younger brother is Francesco Facchinetti.

Facchinetti spent four years in art college in her hometown of Bergamo before settling in Milan, graduating from the Istituto Marangoni in 1995.

== Career ==
From 1994, Facchinetti worked for seven years with Miuccia Prada, first as designer at Prada and later as fashion coordinator for women's and men's at Miu Miu, succeeding Stefano Pilati.

Facchinetti later replaced Christopher Bailey at Gucci and became one of the key members of the brand's design team under Tom Ford in 2001 and, following Ford's resignation, was appointed designer of its women's apparel in 2004. After only her second collection, she was replaced by Frida Giannini. From 2006 to 2007, she subsequently worked as designer for Moncler, where she oversaw the brand's Gamme Rouge collection of outerwear; her last effort for Moncler was the spring 2008 collection.

In 2007, Facchinetti succeeded Valentino Garavani as creative director of the Valentino couture and ready-to-wear women's collections, along with the RED and Roma secondary lines. After some initial success, in 2008 she was dismissed from Valentino, reportedly because she did not draw on the brand's archives.

As reported by Vogue Italia, Facchinetti, along with Pietro Negra launched a new ready-to-wear line named 'Uniqueness' for Pinko, which emphasised the importance of technology in fashion.

In 2013, Facchinetti was appointed by Diego Della Valle, chairman of Tod's, as the brand's creative director, responsible for all the womenswear products, from shoes and bags to apparel, as well as the ad campaigns. Succeeding Derek Lam, she was the brand's first full-time on-site creative director and the first woman in the role. By May 2016, Tod's announced that Facchinetti would be stepping down after three years on the job.

After leaving Tod's in 2016 Facchinetti spent time living in New York, then set up a consulting studio in Milan and took on a number of projects, including opera costume design. In 2018, she designed approximately 90 costumes for Nicola Berloffa's performance of Giuseppe Verdi’s Don Carlo opera at Theater St. Gallen.

In 2020, Facchinetti joined fashion brand Harlan + Holden as the brand's first-ever creative director. In 2022, she partnered with Editions Milano to design a porcelain set.

== Controversy ==
When Facchinetti quit her post at Miu Miu in June 2001, she caused a legal battle with her employer due to a non-compete clause that restricted her from working at another fashion house for six months. Prada sued, and the court ruled against Facchinetti.

In 2008, Facchinetti was one of the persons whose phone was found to have been illegally tapped in the SISMI-Telecom scandal.
