= Patrizio Bertelli =

CEO of Prada (born 1946)

- Born: 6 April 1946 (age 80); Arezzo, Tuscany, Italy
- Education: University of Florence; Bologna University
- Occupation: Businessman
- Title: Co-CEO, Prada Group
- Spouse: Miuccia Prada
- Children: 2, including Lorenzo Bertelli

Patrizio Bertelli (born 6 April 1946) is an Italian businessman and former co-chief executive officer (CEO) of the Prada Group, a role he shared with his wife Miuccia Prada.

== Life and career ==
Bertelli was born in the Tuscan city of Arezzo in 1946 and started his career in the leather goods industry, before transitioning to the luxury sector. At age 21, while attending the University of Bologna he founded Sir Robert, a small leather goods company.

In 1978, Bertelli met Miuccia Prada, granddaughter of Mario Prada, founder of the Prada brand. Their professional relationship later evolved into marriage.

In the 1980s, Bertelli introduced changes to Prada's production processes, aiming to improve quality control and efficiency in the luxury goods sector. These changes played a role in the company’s expansion during the 1980s and 1990s.

In the late 1990s, Bertelli and Miuccia Prada collaborated with architects such as Rem Koolhaas and Herzog & de Meuron to launch the "Prada Epicentres" project.

As of 2023, Bertelli is co-chief executive officer of the Prada Group, which includes Prada, Miu Miu, Church’s, Car Shoe, and Marchesi 1824.

As of May 2025, his net worth was estimated at US$5.4 billion.

== Awards and honours ==
In 2000, Bertelli was awarded an honorary degree by the University of Florence.

In 2013, Forbes included Bertelli and his wife among the most "influential" couples in the world.

On 29 June 2012, Bertelli became the first Italian inducted into the America's Cup Hall of Fame.

== Further interests ==
Bertelli and his wife co-founded Fondazione Prada in 1993.

In 1997, Bertelli established the sailing team Prada Challenge to compete in the America’s Cup 2000.

== Personal life ==
Patrizio Bertelli have three children, Giulio, Lorenzo, and Azzurra and reside in Milan, Italy. Lorenzo Bertelli holds key ownership stakes in the Prada Group.
