= Andrea Guerra =

Andrea Guerra may refer to:

- Andrea Guerra (footballer) (born 1972), former Italian footballer
- Andrea Guerra (composer) (born 1961), Italian film score composer
- Andrea Guerra (businessman) (born 1965), Italian business manager and CEO of Prada
