= Roger Vivier (brand) =

French fashion label

Roger Vivier is a French fashion accessories label founded by Roger Vivier in 1937 that specializes in shoes. In the early 1950s, the brand's namesake designer produced the first modern stiletto heel. Another signature design associated with the brand is the Belle Vivier, an elegant pump with a large chrome-plated buckle. The pump made its debut at the Yves Saint Laurent's fashion show in 1965 and it became one of the most in-demand styles of the decade. In 1967, the shoes were forever immortalized in Luis Buñuel’s film Belle de Jour when Catherine Deneuve wore them.

== History ==
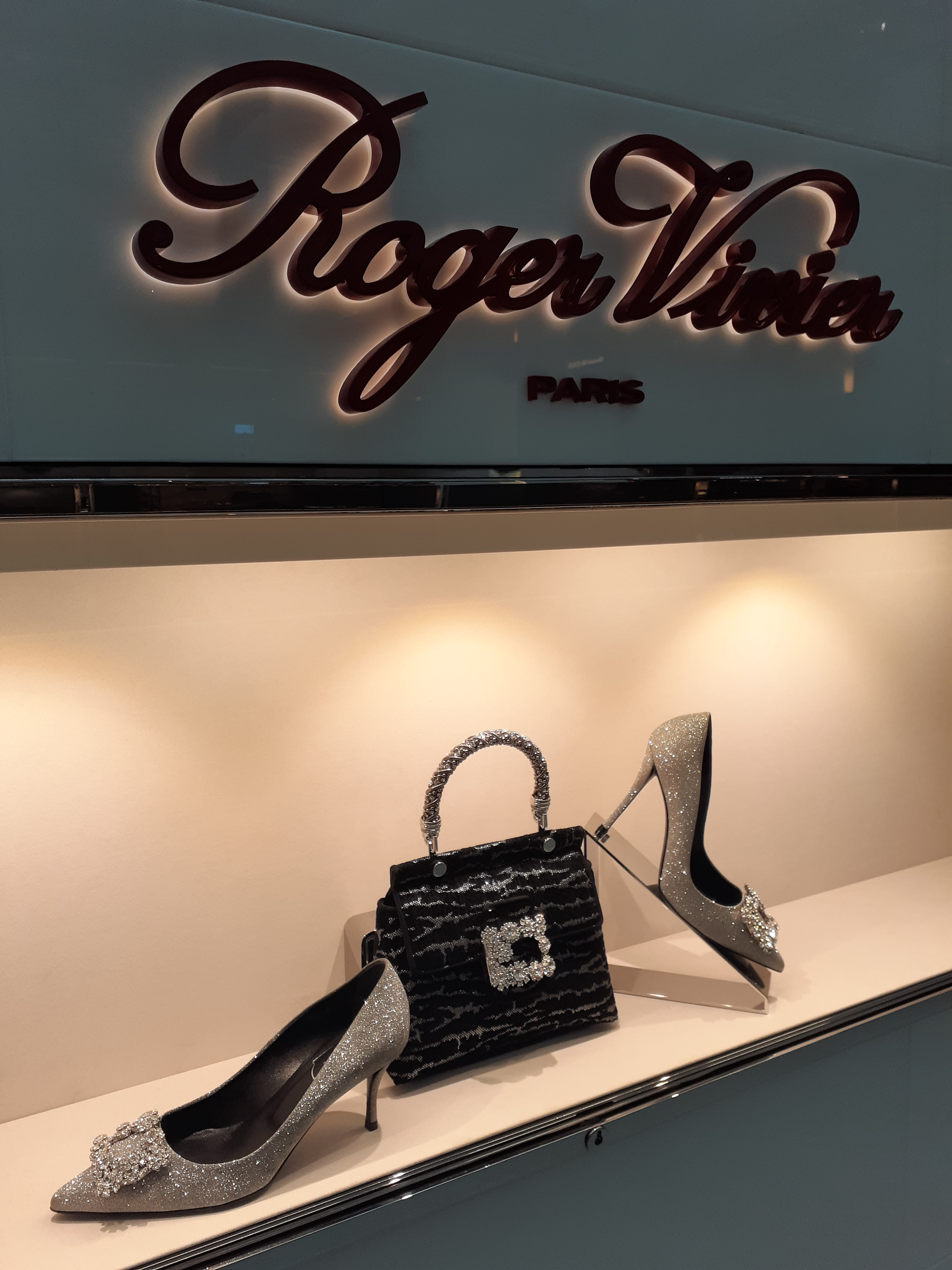
A Roger Vivier boutique in Beijing, China.

Vivier created the label in 1937 and gained immediate popularity for the creation of wedge soles, notably worn by Marlene Dietrich, and later with the modern creation of the stiletto heel in 1954. Along with Marlene Dietrich, the label was worn by a number of mid-century celebrities and socialites including Gloria Guinness, Cary Grant, Jackie Kennedy, Elizabeth Taylor, and The Beatles. Lavish stitching, distinctive architectural forms, glistening crystal details, embellished fastenings, striking hues, and glossy textiles like satin are among the signature motifs found in the brand's collection.

In 1942, the label filed a patent for a shoe that had a large buckle-like clasp at the shoe's throat. It became one of the most iconic shoe designs of the decade. Later, the label launched an updated version of the shoe, a low-heeled Pilgrim pumps with silver buckles, that was produced for Yves Saint Laurent's 1965 Mondrian collection. The shoe received international publicity.

=== Bruno Frisoni, 2002–2018 ===
The Roger Vivier brand has been owned by Diego Della Valle's company, Tod's, since 2000. The business lay dormant for four years while Della Valle built his team, with creative director Bruno Frisoni’s first collection hitting the market for the fall 2004 season. During his time there, he also headed up the house’s couture footwear line, which launched for spring 2007 and wrapped in fall 2010.

In 2010, Roger Vivier launched Rendez-Vous, a limited edition concept designed to bridge the gap between the former couture collection and the house’s main line. It was presented from fall 2010 to spring 2017, in tandem with the couture collections.

In 2011, the brand introduced Roger Vivier — Jeune Fille, a collection of kids’ leather ballerinas.

In 2015, Roger Vivier launched a capsule collection made of selected archival pieces designed by Frisoni.

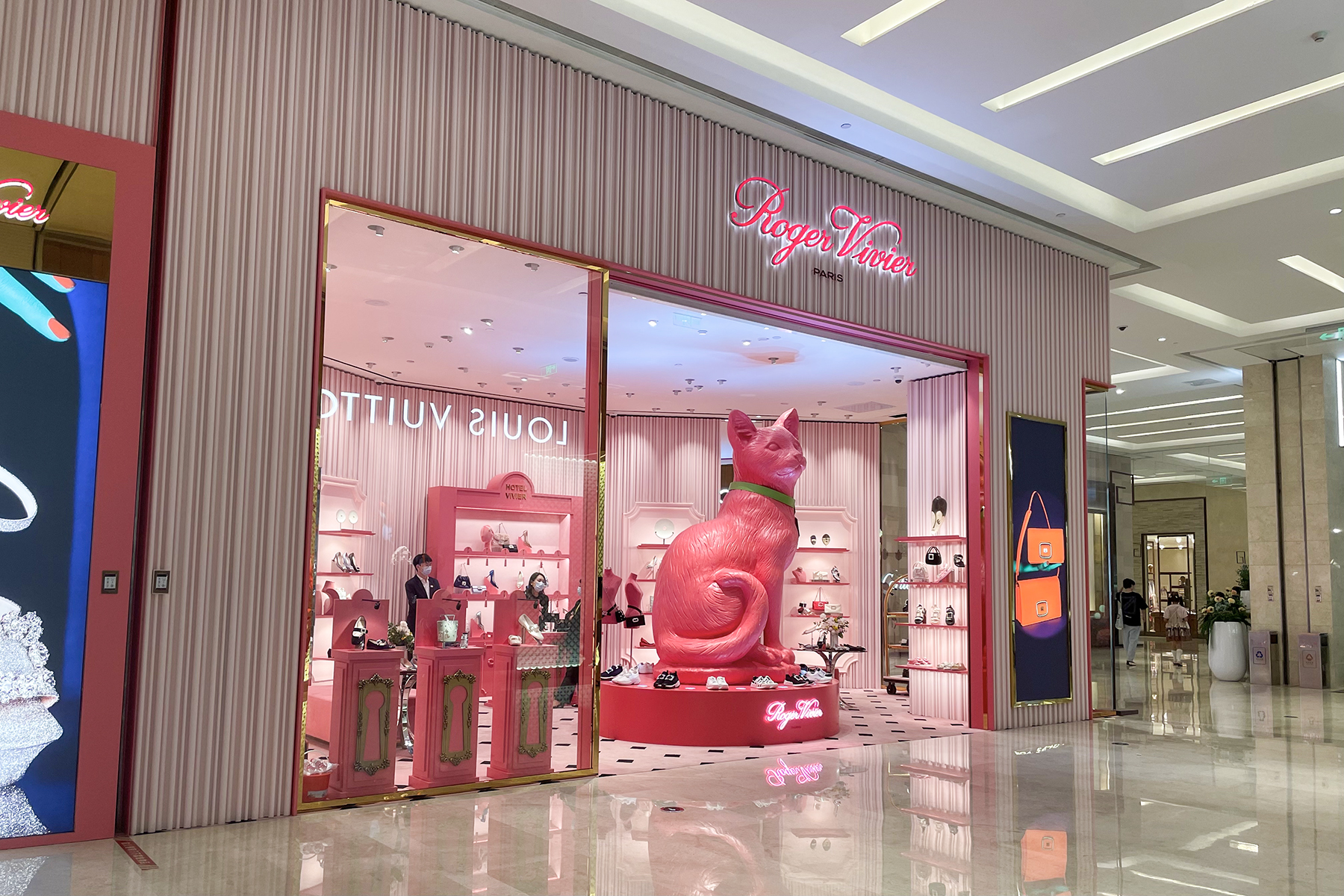
A Roger Vivier boutique.

=== Gherardo Felloni, 2018–present ===
In 2018, Gherardo Felloni became creative director of Roger Vivier.

Upon his arrival, Felloni created new renditions of the designer's classic styles while still maintaining the brand's signature flamboyance and vibrancy. These styles included a buckled shoe with a longer buckle and thicker heel as well as the Maharaja slipper which was made slimmer, covered in stones, and accessorized with a single feather. Roger Vivier handbags have also gathered significant interest in the past 15 years with new models like the Viv’ Choc becoming instant icons. Felloni produces two ready-to-wear collections per year for the label which are shown in parallel to short films co-signed with Andrea Danese, starring celebrity guests such as Catherine Deneuve, Virginie Ledoyen, and Isabelle Huppert.

In 2019, Roger Vivier introduced its first line of jewelry, inspired by the house’s signature square shoe buckle.

== Stores ==
Vivier has an historical boutique on the Rue Faubourg Saint-Honoré, whose design is inspired by Vivier's apartment. There are three shops in the United States, the latest one opening in May 2012.

== Campaigns ==
Roger Vivier has been working with several high-profile photographers for its advertising campaigns, including Olivia Bee (2013), Michael Avedon (2015) and Quentin Jones (2017).

== Recognition ==
Vivier's creations are exhibited at the Metropolitan Museum of Art in New York in the United States, at the Victoria and Albert Museum in London in the United Kingdom, the Bata Shoe Museum in Toronto and the Musée de la mode et du textile at the Louvre in France, a museum which has a Roger Vivier collection since 1987, among many other renowned institutions. In 2013, an exhibition bringing together 140 models created by Roger Vivier was held from November 2 to November 18 at the Palais de Tokyo, under the name "Virgule etc. in the footsteps of Roger Vivier."
