= Acqua di Parma =

Luxury fashion

Acqua Di Parma S.r.l.
- Type: Subsidiary
- Industry: Cosmetics
- Founded: 1916; 110 years ago in Parma
- Headquarters: Milan, Italy
- Area served: Worldwide
- Products: fragrances; candles; bathrobes; leather accessories; personal care products
- Parent: LVMH
- Website: Official website

Acqua di Parma is an Italian company that produces fragrances, candles, soaps, and handcrafted accessories. All of its ranges are made in Italy, and distributed in 43 countries.

== History ==
The company's original fragrance, Colonia, was created in 1916 in a small perfume factory in the center of Parma's historic old town, after which the company is named.

At the time, most commercial perfumes featured heavier and more intense compositions. In contrast, the lighter and fresher fragrance from Parma gained widespread popularity across Europe.

In the 1930s the increasing popularity of the cologne led to an increase in production and the development of its distribution. The thirties and fifties are described as a 'golden age' for Acqua di Parma Colonia, which became very successful among members of high society, with celebrity clientele.

Over the years, the brand expanded its product range, introducing a home collection that includes bathrobes and towels, and leather goods.

In 1993 the brand was revived by entrepreneurs Luca di Montezemolo (former chairman of Ferrari), Diego Della Valle (President and CEO of Tod's, (a shoeware and leather company)) and Paolo Borgomanero (a minority shareholder of lingerie retailer La Perla).

In 1998 Acqua di Parma opened its first boutique on Milan's Via del Gesù (in the Quadrilatero della moda district), followed by Paris's Rue des Francs Bourgeois in Le Marais in 2012, Rome's Piazza di Spagna in 2014, and Miami's Brickell City Centre in 2017.

The company was acquired by multi-national LVMH in 2001, and is now headquartered in Milan.

In May 2008 the company entered the luxury spa market with the Blu Mediterraneo Spa in Porto Cervo (Sardinia). In 2013 the company opened its second spa at the Gritti Palace in Venice.

In 2013, the company launched La Nobiltà del Fare ("The Nobility of Work"), a book focusing on stories of Italian arts and crafts excellence, featuring photography by Giovanni Gastel.

Etihad airways has a deal to supply exclusive leather packs containing samples of the signature fragrance and hand cream in their business, first class and ultimate Residence apartment.

== Company logo ==
The company's logo is the coat of arms of Marie Louise, Duchess of Parma, who ruled from 1816 to 1847. This is in homage to her rule and to the help she provided to develop the perfume and glass industry of Parma.

== Products ==
Colonias:

- Colonia (1916)
- Colonia Assoluta (2003)
- Colonia Intensa (2007)
- Colonia Essenza (2010)
- Colonia Oud (2012)
- Colonia Leather (2014)
- Colonia Ambra (2015)
- Colonia Club (2015)
- Colonia Pura (2017)
- Colonia Futura (2020)
- Colonia Il Profumo (2025)

Feminine fragrances:

- Iris Nobile (2004)
- Profumo (1930 / 2008)
- Magnolia Nobile (2009)
- Gelsomino Nobile (2011)
- Iris Nobile Sublime (2012)
- Acque Nobili (2013)
- Rosa Nobile (2014)

Blu Mediterraneo:

- Mandorlo di Sicilia (1999)
- Arancia di Capri (2000)
- Fico di Amalfi (2006)
- Mirto di Panarea (2008)
- Bergamotto di Calabria (2010)
- Ginepro di Sardegna (2014)
- Chinotto di Liguria (2018)
- Cipresso di Toscana (2019)

Collezione Barbiere

Blu Mediterraneo Italian Resort

Home fragrances (room sprays and candles)

Home collection (bathrobes and towels)

Leather collections

Gli Esclusivi (luxury home and travel accessories)

== Packaging ==
The company has continued the cylindrical bottles, rounded boxes and bright yellow packaging of the original product. It included a blue variant which was meant to "evoke the energy, the sun and the colours of the Italian Mediterranean."

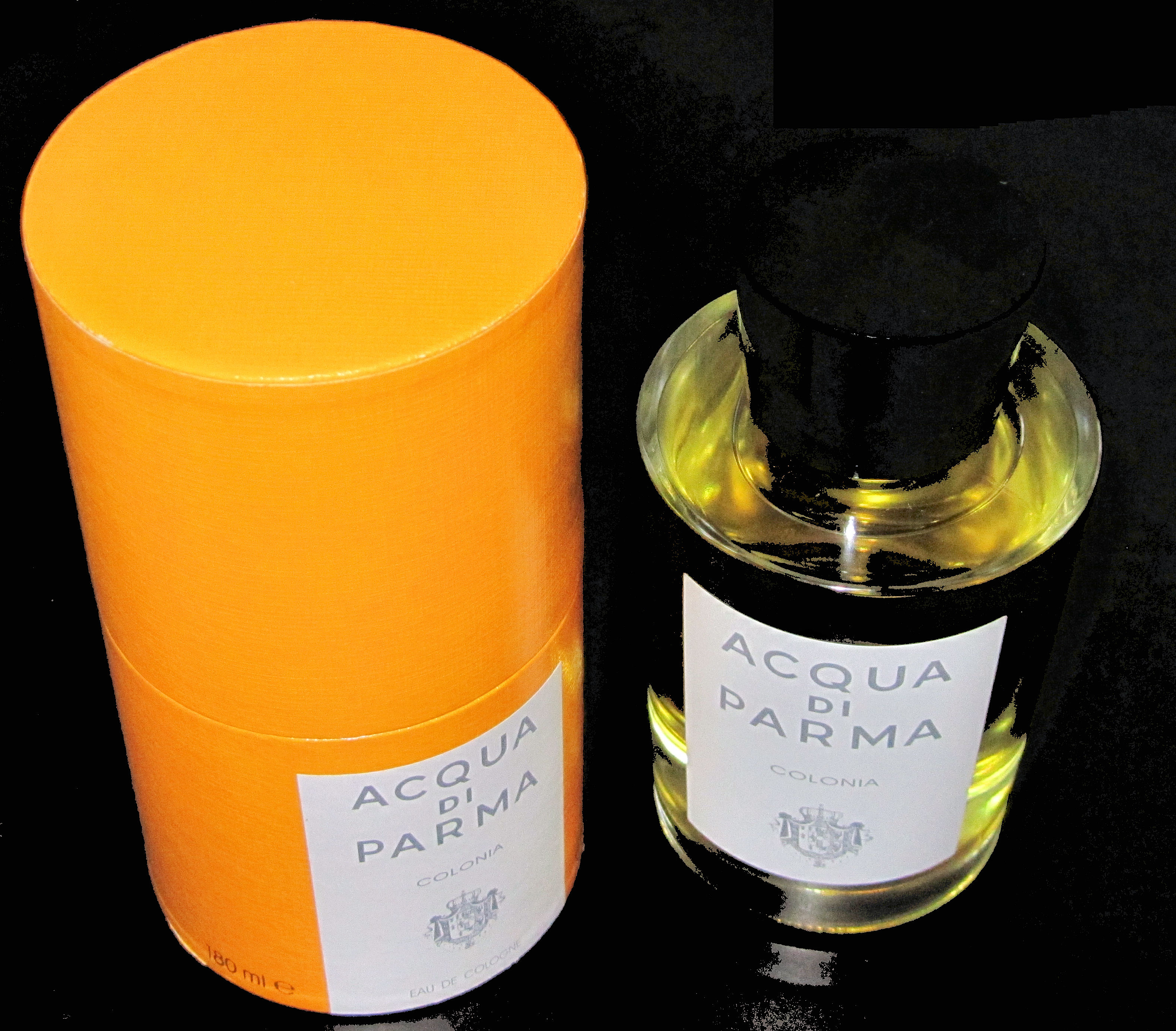
The current packaging

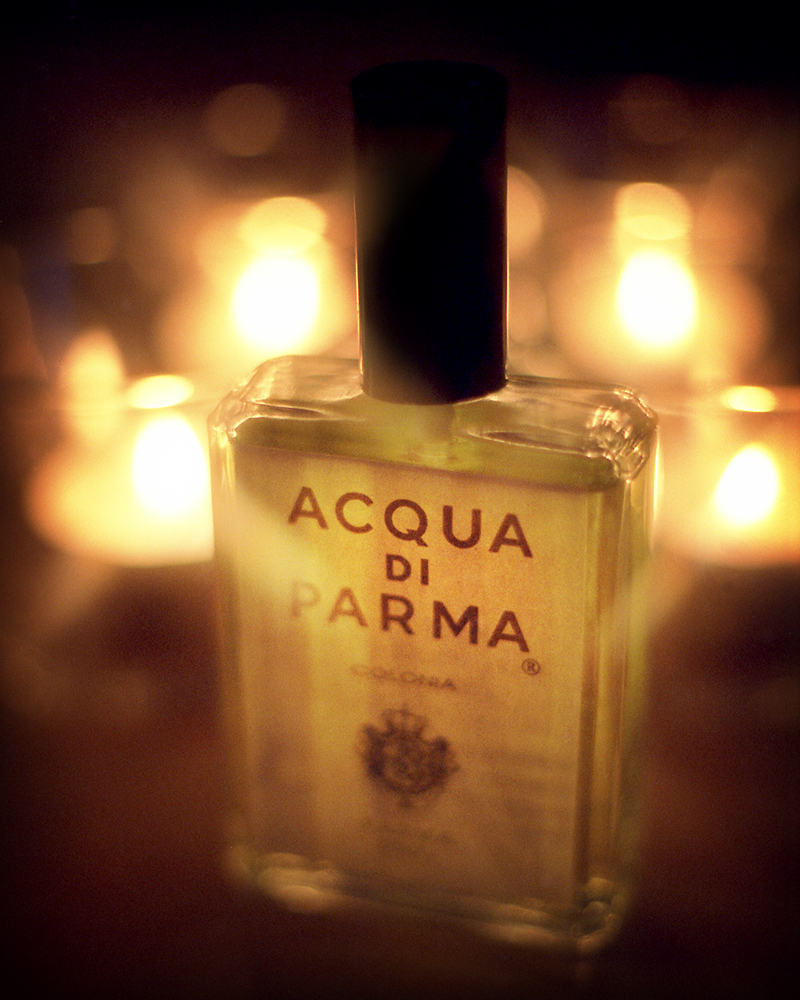
The former bottle
