= John Galantic =

American-Swiss businessperson

- Born: John Galantic; 1961 (age 64–65); Boston, Massachusetts, U.S.
- Education: Tufts University (BA); Harvard Business School (MBA)
- Occupation: Business executive
- Employer: AS Roma
- Board member of: AS Roma; Ferrari; Bacardi
- Children: 2

John S. Galantic is an American-Swiss business executive who is the chief executive officer of AS Roma, an Italian football club.

== Early life and education ==
John Galantic was born in 1961 to Ivan and Elizabeth Joyce Galantic in Boston, Massachusetts. Ivan was an art history professor, while Elizabeth Joyce was an English literature professor.

Galantic earned his Bachelor's degree from Tufts University and later, a Master of Business Administration degree from Harvard Business School in 1990.

== Career ==
Galantic began his career at Procter & Gamble, serving with the company in Italy, the United Kingdom, and the United States. He later became the head of marketing at SmithKline Beecham, holding the role from 1995 to 2000. Galantic managed the brand portfolios of private and public companies, including Coty Beauty, where he served as president and chief operating officer.

=== Luxury fashion brands ===
In 2006, Galantic became the president and chief operating officer of Chanel Inc. He would depart from the roles in June 2023, having spent sixteen years with the company. Galantic's tenure was credited with overseeing the expansion of the brand's digital footprint and growing the business to $17.2 billion in revenue by 2022. In addition, he led philanthropic initiatives for Chanel.

In September 2024, Galantic became chief executive officer of Tod's Group, replacing Diego Della Valle in that role. He resigned from his position in May 2026, taking on the role of CEO with the Italian football club, AS Roma, shortly after.

=== AS Roma ===
In July 2026, Galantic joined AS Roma as the football club’s chief executive officer. He previously had a relationship with the club as a board member from 2014 to 2020.

=== Board roles ===
Galantic is a board member of Ferrari and Bacardi. He has previously served on the board of directors of AS Roma, Tod’s, Chanel, and Zoom Media.

== Personal life ==
Galantic is married with two children.
