= Byblos (fashion brand) =

Italian fashion brand

- Type: Fashion brand
- Industry: Fashion
- Founded: 1973
- Key people: Manuel Facchini
- Products: Ready-to-wear, accessories
- Website: https://byblosofficial.com/

Byblos is an Italian fashion brand founded in 1973 as a youthful ready-to-wear line of the Italian fashion company Genny. The brand became independent in 1983 and gained international recognition during the 1980s and early 1990s, particularly under the direction of designers including Gianni Versace, Guy Paulin, Keith Varty and Alan Cleaver.

The brand was owned by the Prada Group in the early 2000s and was sold to the Italian company Swinger International in 2002. In 2018, designer Manuel Facchini took control of Byblos through a newly established company, Byblos S.r.l.

Since 2022, Facchini has served as Byblos's chief executive officer and creative director, overseeing a relaunch focused on technology, contemporary art, sustainability and new forms of digital fashion.

== History ==
=== Foundation ===
Byblos was established in 1973 as part of the Genny group, the Italian fashion company founded by Arnaldo Girombelli. The brand was created as a youthful ready-to-wear line and took its name from the Byblos Hotel in Saint-Tropez, France.

The brand initially employed a succession of designers. Gianni Versace became associated with Byblos in the 1970s, while Guy Paulin subsequently worked for the brand. In 1983, Byblos became an independent company within the Genny group.

=== Varty and Cleaver ===
Byblos became particularly prominent during the 1980s under British designers Keith Varty and Alan Cleaver. Varty and Cleaver had studied at the Royal College of Art in London and were recruited to work for Byblos in the early 1980s.

Their designs were characterized by bright colours, graphic patterns, knitwear and a youthful combination of sportswear and more formal clothing. Byblos became known internationally for its colourful and unconventional approach to ready-to-wear during this period.

Contemporary coverage of the brand's collections associated Varty and Cleaver with Byblos throughout the early 1990s. In 1997, The Washington Post reported that designer Richard Tyler had taken over the Byblos collection from Varty and Cleaver.

After Varty and Cleaver, Byblos appointed a succession of designers, including Richard Tyler and Richard Bartlett. Other designers associated with the brand in the 1990s and early 2000s included Martine Sitbon and Sandy Dalal.

=== Prada and Swinger International ===
In 2001, the Prada Group acquired Genny and its associated brands, including Byblos. In April 2002, Prada confirmed that it would sell Byblos to Swinger International, an Italian fashion company based in Verona.

Under Swinger International, Byblos continued to operate as a ready-to-wear fashion brand. Manuel Facchini became its creative director in 2006.

Facchini developed collections that combined elements of contemporary art, technology and nature with Byblos's established emphasis on colour and experimentation. In 2018, he took control of the brand through Byblos S.r.l., following the division of the Facchini family's fashion businesses.

=== Relaunch under Manuel Facchini ===
Byblos entered a new phase in the early 2020s under Facchini's leadership. In 2022, Facchini became chief executive officer and creative director and relaunched the brand with an emphasis on technology, sustainability, inclusivity and digital forms of fashion presentation.

In February 2022, Byblos opened a concept flagship store at 33 Via della Spiga in Milan's Quadrilatero della moda district. The store was designed around digital and organic forms and was intended to reflect the brand's approach to technology and nature.

In 2022, Byblos returned to the Milan Fashion Week calendar with a digital presentation of its autumn/winter collection. The relaunch included the use of 3D technology and experimentation with virtual fashion and digital retail.

In April 2022, Facchini presented Byblos's first collection in two years, "Twisted," as a fashion film rather than a runway show, and said the brand would not return to traditional fashion weeks. The relaunch targeted Gen Z and millennial consumers, shifted the brand away from wholesale toward direct retail and e-commerce, and set a revenue target of €20–30 million within two to three years. Byblos also redesigned its logo as an equilateral triangle and signed licensing deals for kidswear, footwear, bags and accessories.

Under Facchini, the brand has continued to combine fashion with digital technologies and contemporary art. Its InnerSelf spring/summer 2024 collection, for example, was developed in collaboration with the 3D fashion technology company Style3D.

== Design and products ==
Byblos is known for a youthful and colourful approach to Italian ready-to-wear. During the 1980s and early 1990s, the brand became particularly associated with graphic prints, experimental knitwear, bright colours and combinations of sportswear and more formal silhouettes.

The brand has produced women's and men's clothing and accessories. During the 1990s and 2000s, its product range was expanded to include fragrances and eyewear.

Under Facchini, Byblos has incorporated digital technologies and references to contemporary art, architecture and natural forms into its collections. The brand's recent work has included digital fashion projects and collaborations involving 3D design technologies.
