= Derek Lam =

American fashion designer (born 1967)

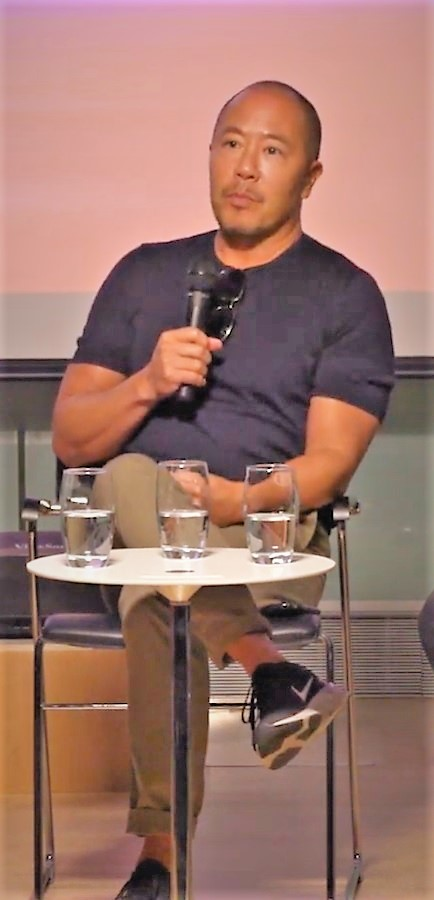
- Lam in 2019
- Born: 1967 (age 58–59); San Francisco, California, US
- Education: Parsons School for Design
- Labels: Derek Lam; Derek Lam 10 Crosby

Derek Lam (born 1967) is an American fashion designer. In addition to designing his own line, Lam was Tod's creative director for ready-to-wear and accessories from 2005 until 2010.

== Early life and education ==
Lam was born in San Francisco, California and is of Chinese American parentage. Lam is the youngest of three children in his fourth-generation family. His parents had a business that imported clothes from Asia, and his grandparents ran a successful garment factory in San Francisco that specialized in bridal and wedding dresses.

Lam graduated in 1990 from Parsons School of Design in Manhattan.

== Career ==
=== Early beginnings ===
Lam began working as an assistant for Michael Kors in the 90s and worked there for four years. Lam then moved to Hong Kong to work for a large retail brand. Following his Hong Kong experience, Derek returned to New York and was appointed Vice President of Design for Michael Kors' Kors line.

=== Derek Lam, 2003–2020 ===
In 2003, Lam launched his own label. He debuted at the New York Fashion Week in September 2003. In 2005, Lam won the runner-up prize in the CFDA/Vogue Fashion Fund competition as well as the CFDA Perry Ellis Swarovski Award for new designers.

In the following years, Derek Lam and Derek Lam 10 Crosby brands soon expanded to include shoes and handbags collections. In 2006, Lam also signed a three-year worldwide licensing deal with New York-based Modo to manufacture and distribute Derek Lam-branded eyewear.

From 2008 to 2012, the JAB Holding Company's Labelux division held a majority stake in Derek Lam. In 2009, the brand opened a store designed by the Japanese architecture firm, SANAA, but it eventually closed. In February 2010, the brand launched an e-commerce website selling the collections of ready-to-wear and accessories.

In 2012, Lam entered into a global licensing agreement with Schwartz & Benjamin, which handled design, manufacturing and wholesale for the expanded collection of Derek Lam shoes.

Beginning with the spring 2018 season, Derek Lam introduced beachwear to his collection through a license with Swiss-based Italian manufacturing firm Albisetti.

In 2019, Lam closed his eponymous luxury collection to focus more on Derek Lam 10 Crosby – which at the time accounted for 70 percent of the company’s overall business – and its expansion to contemporary styles. In January 2020, Public Clothing Company acquired the Derek Lam brand. Lam remained the Chief Creative Officer of the Derek Lam business, including Derek Lam 10 Crosby. Regarding the sale, Lam said in an interview, “Dan and his team have a tremendous opportunity to grow the branded business, both geographically and with new product categories. There’s a huge opportunity in international that has essentially been untapped."

=== Tod’s, 2006–2012 ===
In 2006, Diego Della Valle signed Derek Lam up to create a clothing brand for Tod's. In 2008, Lam presented the brand's first-ever jewelry collection.

In 2010, Tod’s extended its contract with Lam for another two years. In 2012, the company announced that Lam would be leaving at the end of his contract in September that year.

=== Derek Lam 10 Crosby, 2011–2023 ===
In 2011, Lam launched the Derek Lam 10 Crosby diffusion line.

In 2015, Lam launched a fragrance collection under the Derek Lam 10 Crosby brand; by 2018, the Derek Lam beauty license was acquired by the Premiere Group.

Also in 2015, Lam and Modo entered a worldwide licensing agreement for the design, manufacture and distribution of eyewear frames and sunglasses under the Derek Lam 10 Crosby brand.

Lam is also incorporating sustainable fashion into his collections. Lam is using non-chromed leather and eco-viscose in his designs. Use of recycled cashmere and polyester and raw eco materials in knitwear are also areas he is expanding upon.

In an interview, Lam said the most challenging part of his job is that many people use the product now. As a result, launching a new design is not only about his own preferences; he and his team consider how people will use it and expect a strong response from users.

Lam ended his work for Derek Lam 10 Crosby in 2023.

=== Câllas Milano, 2024–present ===
In 2024, Lam joined Italian brand Câllas Milano as creative director.

== Personal life ==
Lam is married to Jan-Hendrik Schlottmann (born 1965), also his business partner. They lived in Gramercy Park, Manhattan before moving to Paris in 2023.

== Filmography ==
- Seamless, 2005

== See also ==
- Chinese people in New York City
- LGBT culture in New York City
- List of LGBT people from New York City
- NYC Pride March
