= Diana bag =

Diana bag may refer to a variety of bag collections named after Diana, Princess of Wales:

- Gucci Diana, by the Italian luxury fashion house Gucci
- Lady Dior, by the French luxury fashion house Dior
- Di Bag, by the Italian luxury fashion house Tod's
