= Pinko (fashion) =

Italian women's fashion brand

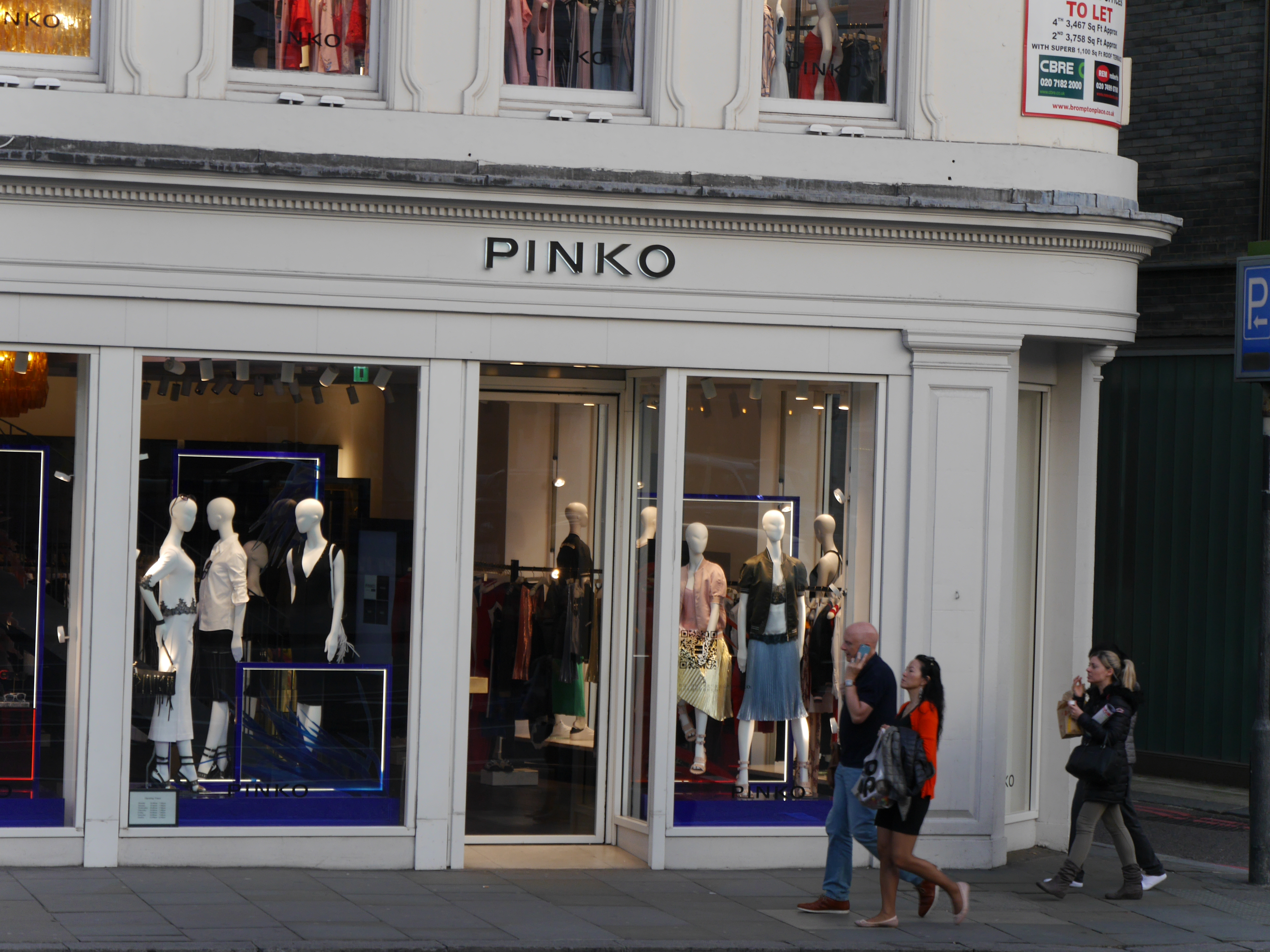
- Pinko store on Brompton Road, London.
- Industry: Fashion
- Founded: 1986; 40 years ago Fidenza, Italy
- Founder: Pietro Negra and Cristina Rubini
- Headquarters: Fidenza, Italy
- Area served: Worldwide
- Products: Women’s ready-to-wear, accessories, Fashion Jewelry, Leather goods, shoes
- Website: www.pinko.com

Pinko is an Italian women's fashion brand. It was founded in the early 1980s by Pietro Negra, the current CEO, and his wife Cristina Rubini. As of 2016, they have over 500 retail outlets worldwide.

Designers who have created collections for Pinko include Mark Fast, Alessandra Facchinetti, and Marina Spadafora. Pietro Negra's daughters, Cecilia and Caterina, work for Pinko.

== See also ==
- Italian fashion
