= Tod's =

Italian luxury fashion house

Tod's S.p.A.

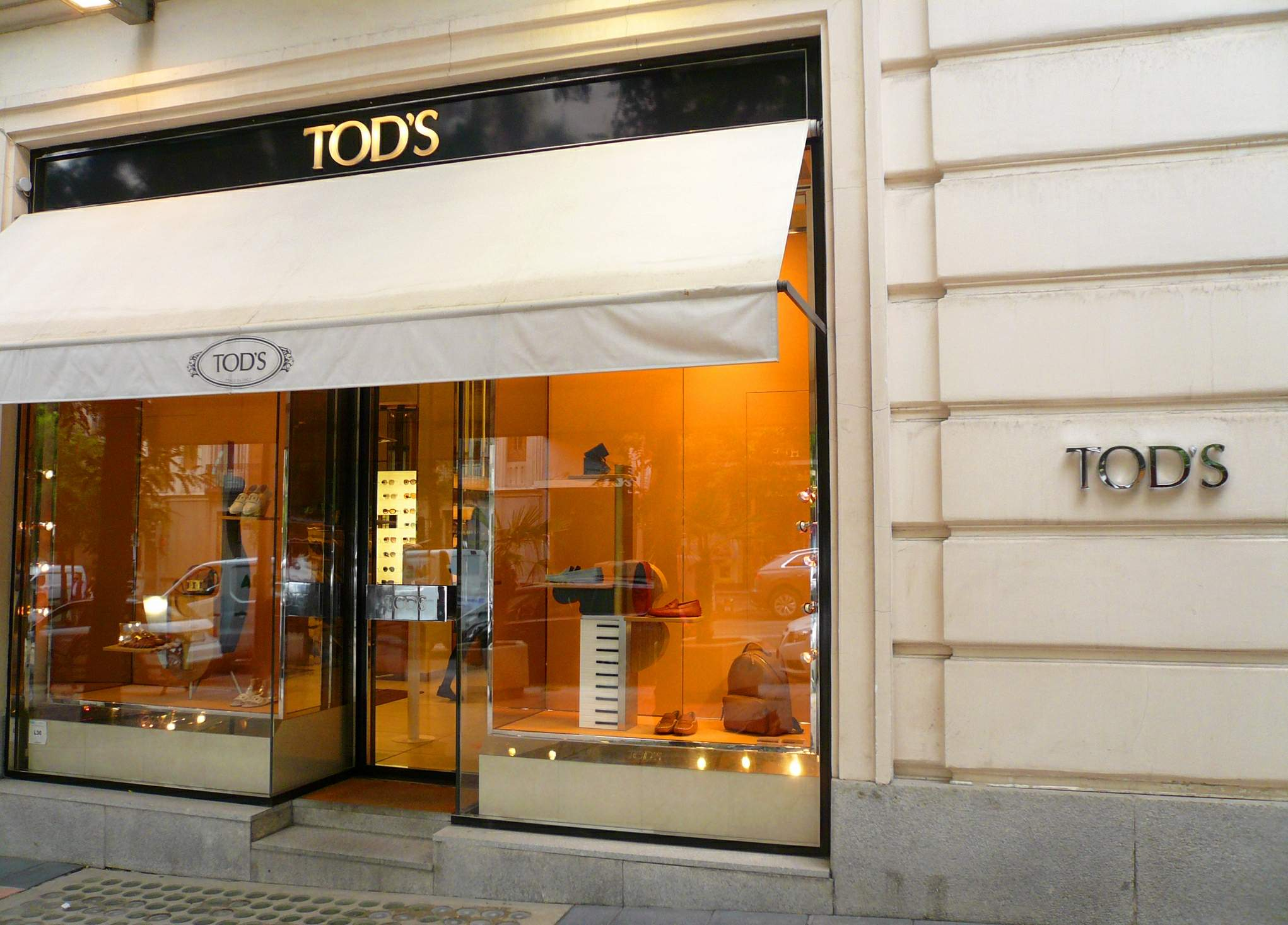
- Tod's boutique in Madrid, Spain, 2018
- Type: Società per azioni (S.p.A.)
- Traded as: BIT: TOD (until 2024)
- ISIN: IT0003007728
- Industry: Fashion
- Founded: 1920; 106 years ago
- Founder: Filippo Della Valle
- Headquarters: Sant'Elpidio a Mare, Italy
- Key people: Diego Della Valle (Chairman); Chiara Ferragni (designer/former board member)
- Products: Luxury goods
- Revenue: ▲€1.1 billion (2023)
- Operating income: ▲€94.7 million (2023)
- Net income: ▲€50.0 million (2023)
- Total assets: ▲€4.3 billion (2023)
- Total equity: ▲€1.1 million (2023)
- Owner: Della Valle family (64.4%)
- Number of employees: 5,123 (2023)
- Parent: Tod's Group
- Subsidiaries: Roger Vivier
- Website: tods.com todsgroup.com

Tod's S.p.A. is an Italian luxury fashion company specializing in footwear, leather goods, and accessories. Originating as a family shoemaking business founded in the late 1920s, it was expanded into industrial production in the 1970s by Diego Della Valle and grew internationally from the 1980s. The company also developed the Fay and Hogan brands under what became Tod's Group, and was publicly listed on the Borsa Italiana in 2000 until its privatization in 2024.

Tod's has been repeatedly involved in controversies concerning governance, intellectual property, and public–private boundaries. The group's acquisition of French luxury shoemaker Roger Vivier in the 1990s drew sustained criticism from investors and media over alleged self-dealing by the controlling Della Valle family, culminating in a disputed valuation and subsequent whitewash procedure. In 2011, Tod's faced public backlash and regulatory intervention after attempting to secure exclusive commercial rights to the image of the Colosseum in exchange for funding its restoration. The company has also been the subject of recurring imitation and trademark disputes, including long-standing accusations that its flagship Gommino shoe copied the earlier The Original Car Shoe design, litigation over a "double-T" logo, and renewed international criticism over alleged copying and cultural appropriation in the mid-2020s.

In the 2020s, governance concerns resurfaced during failed and renewed privatization attempts, with activist investors challenging the fairness of valuation methodologies used by the board. In 2024, Tod's was taken private following a transaction involving the Della Valle family and L Catterton (backed by LVMH), ending its stock-market listing. In 2025, Italian prosecutors announced an investigation into Tod's and several executives over alleged labour abuses and misleading "Made in Italy" claims linked to third-party suppliers, and sought a temporary ban on the company's advertising.

== Corporate history ==
=== Founding ===
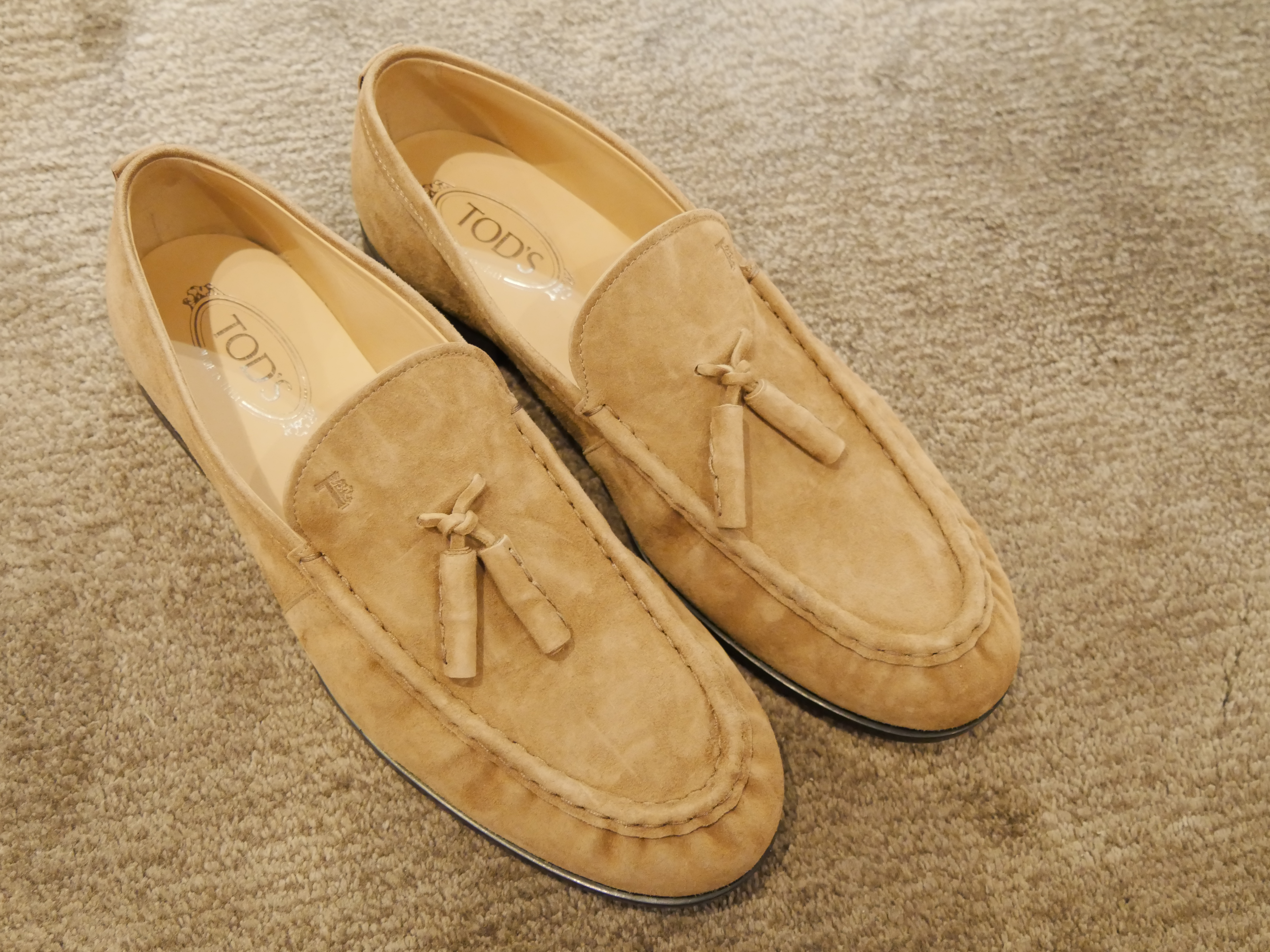
Tod's light suede loafers with tassels, 2021

Filippo Della Valle started the shoemaking business out of his family home in the late 1920s. Diego Della Valle, the elder son of Dorino, and a grandson of Filippo, expanded the workshop and turned it into a factory that started manufacturing shoes in the 1970s. During the 1980s, Diego used nascent marketing strategies such as influencer marketing. He named the company J.P. Tod's in 1978. The brand later dropped the "J.P." in 1999 after the brand became inadvertently known as solely "J.P.'s" instead of the preferred Tod's. He selected the name from a Boston, Massachusetts phonebook in an effort to Americanize the Italian brand and court high-end consumers in New York.

They introduced the "Gommino" leather (suede) loafers in 1979 and their signature handbag collection in 1980. The shoe is widely viewed as a knockoff of the Original Car Shoe which was founded in 1963 and pioneered the driving loafer.

=== Creation of Tod's Group and Roger Vivier acquisition controversy (1986-2003) ===
In an effort to diversify the family's business interests, they launched two sister brands, Fay (in 1986) and Hogan (in 1988), later forming Tod's Group.

Tod's Group subsequently bought 60% of Roger Vivier, the French shoemaker known for the stiletto heel, in 1995. Tod's later acquired further stock in Roger Vivier for €415 million, growing their stake from 57.5% to 60.7%. By late 1990s, Diego turned over the day-to-day operation of the business to Andrea, his younger brother. Time described their family dynamic in 2006 with: "Andrea plays the goalie to Diego's striker, the introverted, behind-the-scenes power broker to Diego's extroverted, genial public persona." Tod's sales increased from €220 million in 2000 to €371 million in 2003. Tod's went public in November 2000, listing on the Milan Stock Exchange at a valuation of €1.2 billion.

The Roger Vivier acquisition proved controversial with accusations that the Della Valle brothers had enriched themselves at the expense of other shareholders. The brand's sales, virtually non-existent in 2003, reached €156m as the family sold it to Tod's for €435m. The questionable acquisition created the need for a whitewash procedure.

=== Stability, corporate hires (2006-2017) ===
In 2006, Derek Lam became the creative director of Tod's.

Tod's was one of the few luxury companies worldwide to increase sales and profits during the 2008 financial crisis, with profit growing from €83 million in 2008 to €86 million in 2009.

In 2012, Derek Lam resigned as creative director and was later replaced by Alessandra Facchinetti in 2013.

In 2014, the brand hired Andrea Incontri as its menswear creative director.

In January 2017, Italian businessman Andrea Bonomi – through his Strategic Capital fund – took a 3% stake in Tod's to support its long-term growth.

==== Attempted Colosseum logo licensing ====
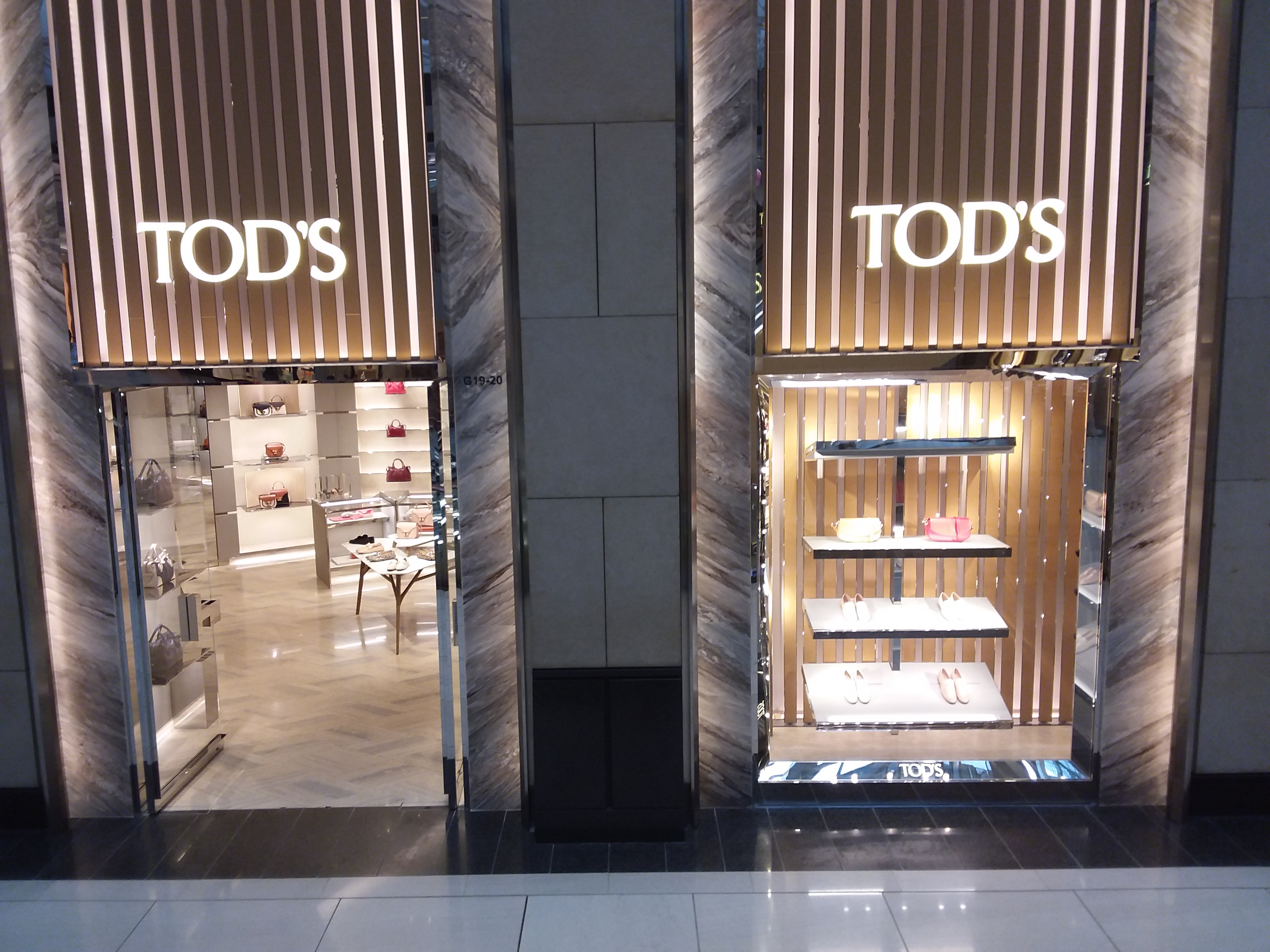
A Tod's store front in Hong Kong, 2020

In 2011, Tod's attempted to purchase exclusive rights to the Colosseum logo and images for 15 years in exchange for €25 million ($31.99 million) in sponsorship towards its renovation. The agreement was suspended after complaints by the Italian Labour Union (UIL) and Codacons, a consumer organization.

=== 2019-2024: Privatization by LVMH/L Catterton ===
From 2019 onward, Diego Della Valle started purchasing Tod's shares as they came under pressure due to sliding sales, increasing his ownership to 81.2%. In early 2021, LVMH raised its investment in the group from 3.2% to 10%. In May 2021, the market value of Tod's was €1.6 billion. In 2022, Della Valle and his brother Andrea offered to buy out other investors at €40 a share for up to €338 million ($344 million) – valuing the company at €1.32 billion ($1.3 billion) – and to de-list the company via a merger with their holding company DeVa Finance. In September 2022, the Italian Companies and Exchange Commission (CONSOB) approved the proposed buyout.

Tabor Asset Management published a pair of public open letters noting the discrepancy in multiples identified by Tod's board when providing its fairness opinions and those used by banks. The privatization attempt was unsuccessful.

In 2023, creative director Walter Chiapponi stepped down from the role, having held the position since 2019. Chiapponi would be replaced by Matteo Tamburini.

In 2024, the Della Valle family entered a deal with private equity firm L Catterton, backed by LVMH's Bernard Arnault, to take Tod's private. L Catterton are to purchase 36% of shares at 17% premium of market value, and the Della Valle family will retain control with 54% of the company. 10% of the company will remain owned by an investment arm of LVMH. If the delisting bid fails, the entities have announced intentions to merge.

In September 2024, John Galantic became chief executive officer of Tod’s Group, replacing Diego Della Valle in that role. Galantic resigned from his position in May 2026, taking on the role of CEO with Italian football club AS Roma shortly after.

=== 2025 prosecution for labor practices ===
In 2025, Italian prosecutors announced that Tod's and three of its executives were under investigation for suspected labour abuses and false "made in Italy" claims while using third-party Chinese suppliers. Therefore they the prosecutors sought a six month blanket ban forbidding the company from all advertising. According to Reuters, this was "the first time an Italian fashion house and its managers have been directly targeted over alleged labour exploitation".

== Imitation accusations ==
In 2014, Ferrari director Lapo Elkann attacked Tod's then-CEO Diego Della Valle in a series of posts including the common accusation that Tod's flagship gommino shoe (launched in 1979) was an imitation of The Original Car Shoe (founded in 1963, now owned by Prada), declaring “Car Shoe founded in 1963…The original!"

In 2023, luxury handbag brand Tribe of Two sued Tod's for trademark infringement after it introduced a "double-T" logo that was confusingly similar to Tribe of Two's logo that had been registered with the United States Patent and Trademark Office since 2013.

In October 2025, Tod’s became the focus of viral controversy in its key market of Brazil after being accused of copying and engaging in cultural appropriation. The issue gained national traction and coverage, with millions of social-media users discussing Tod’s copying of the Tribe of Two logo and Car Shoe. Although no lawsuits in Brazil have arisen from the episode, experts note that the strong digital response shows growing consumer vigilance regarding intellectual property and the behavior of luxury brands.

== See also ==
- Fashion in Italy, France, and the United States
- Moncler, Gucci, and Ferragamo
- Moët Hennessy Louis Vuitton (LVMH), Kering, and Richemont
- Diana, Princess of Wales, her impact on fashion, and the Diana bag
