= Mario Prada =

Founder of Prada (1894–1958)

- Born: 1894; Milan, Kingdom of Italy
- Died: 1958 (aged 63–64); Italy
- Occupation: Fashion designer
- Known for: Founder and original designer of Prada
- Relatives: Miuccia Prada (granddaughter)

Mario Prada (1894–1958) was the founder and original designer of the fashion label Prada, a company specializing in many high-fashion goods for men and women, including shoes, handbags, luggage, and leather goods. Prada was founded in 1913.

== Founding of Prada ==
Prada was founded in 1913 by Mario Prada and his brother Martino as Fratelli Prada (English: Prada Brothers). The company was originally headquartered in Milan, Italy. The first Prada store was opened in the Galleria Vittorio Emanuele II. The shop sold leather goods and imported English steamer trunks and handbags, as well as travel accessories, beauty cases, jewelry, luxury items, and rare objects. In 1919, Prada was awarded the title of Official Supplier to the Italian Royal Household. This allowed the company to incorporate the House of Savoy's coat of arms and knotted rope design into its logo. As Mario's son harboured no interest in the business, it was Mario's daughter Luisa who took the helm of Prada as his successor and ran it for almost twenty years. Her own daughter, Miuccia Prada, joined the company in 1970, eventually taking over for her mother in 1978.

== See also ==
- Miu Miu
