= Andrea Guerra (businessman) =

Italian businessman (born 1965)

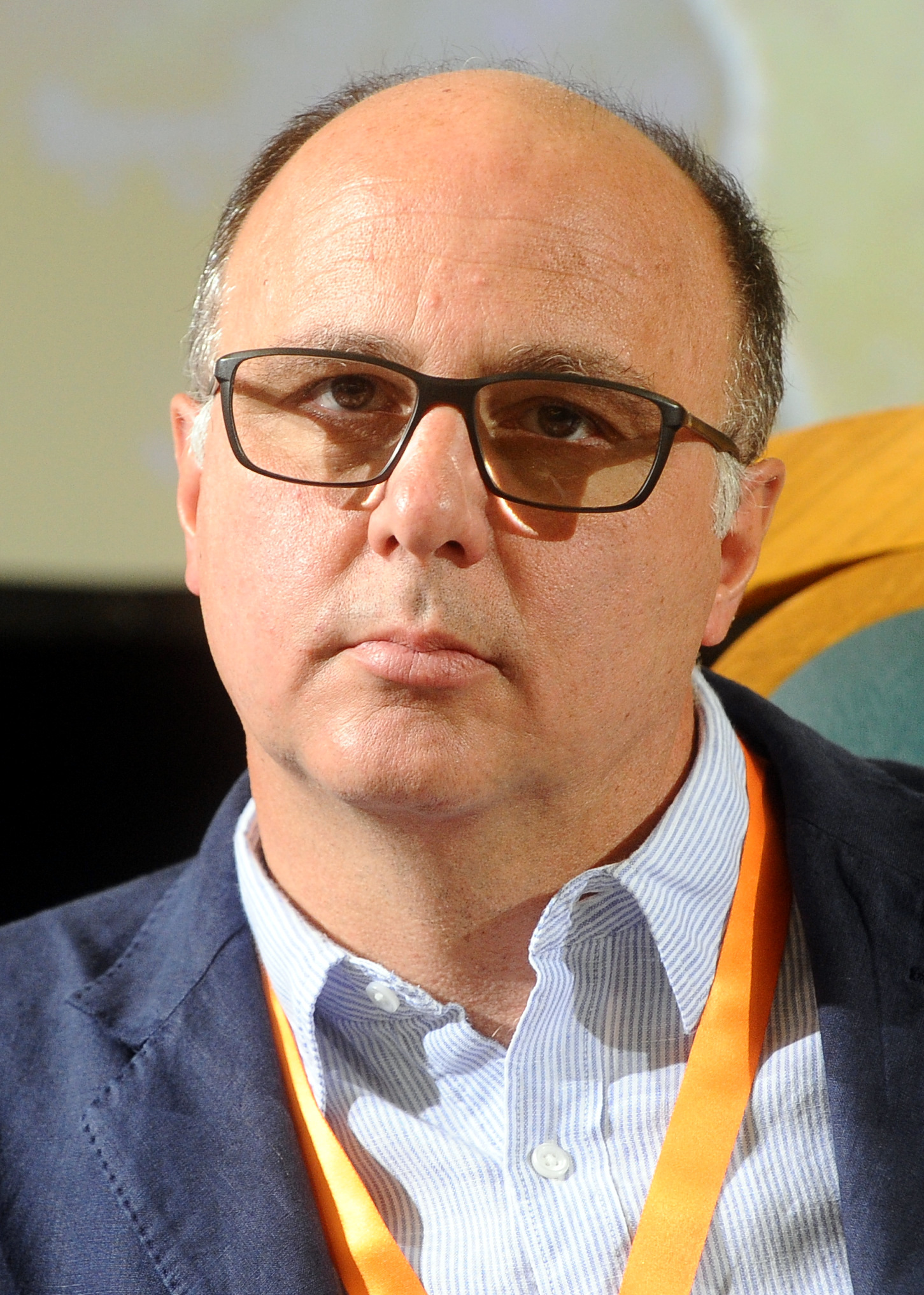
- Guerra in 2014
- Born: Andrea Guerra; May 26, 1965 (age 61); Milan, Italy
- Education: Sapienza University of Rome
- Occupations: CEO of Prada; Former CEO of Luxottica and Eataly
- Years active: 1994–present

Andrea Guerra (born 26 May 1965) is an Italian businessman who presently is the CEO of Prada, a position he has held since 2023.

Guerra was formerly CEO of Luxottica from July 2004 to August 2014. Before that, he worked for ten years at Merloni Elettrodomestici, now Indesit, rising to managing director. From October 2016 to 2020, he was executive chairman of Eataly, and from 2020 to 2022, he led LVMH's hospitality division.

== Biography ==
Guerra was born in Milan. He attended St. George's British International School before graduating with a degree in business from Sapienza University of Rome in 1989.

Guerra began his professional activity with Marriott Italia, where he rose to the office of marketing manager. In 1994 he joined Merloni Elettrodomestici, where for six years he held responsible jobs in sales, production, and central services.

In 2000 he was appointed the group's CEO, replacing outgoing manager Francesco Caio, which was at the end of his mandate.

Under his guidance, Merloni Elettrodomestici increased sales each year and closed 2003 with €3,008 million, 21% more than the previous year. In 2004 Andrea Guerra left this position to join Luxottica, and his place at Merloni Elettrodomestici was taken over by general manager Marco Milani. In addition to official recognition from Merloni Elettrodomestici for the results achieved during his tenure, Andrea Guerra was included in the 2004 Financial Times list of "25 business stars".

Guerra joined Luxottica in 2004 as CEO, in place of Roberto Chemello, who had held that position since 1985. Under Guerra's stewardship, the value of Luxottica's share price rose from €14 in 2003 to €40 in 2014, and company sales almost tripled, from €2.8 billion in 2003 to over €7 billion in 2013. Andrea Guerra maintained his position until 1 September 2014, when Leonardo del Vecchio, Luxottica's founder and chairman announced his departure at the end of the board of directors term.

In the February 2014, when Matteo Renzi's government was being formed, some Italian media suggested his possible involvement in the government team, this possibility denied by Guerra himself.

In September 2015, he was named executive chairman of the food retail company Eataly. From 2020 to 2022, he led LVMH's hospitality division as well as played a role in the development of Thélios, LVMH's eyewear division.

In Spring 2023, Guerra was appointed as the CEO of Italian luxury house Prada, a decision first confirmed by Prada in December 2022 after speculation. One of Guerra's first moves as CEO was to dual list Prada's stock on not only the Hong Kong Stock Exchange but also a European stock exchange. Guerra's tenure is expected to assist with the transition of a new generation of leadership for Prada.

== Other positions ==
- Member of the committee of Italian Strategic Fund (Fondo Strategico Italiano S.p.A.)
- Former member of the board of Amplifon S.p.A.
- Shareholder of online newspaper Linkiesta.
- Member of the boards of directors of Bocconi University and Save the Children Italia Onlus.
- Over the years he has held the position of director on the boards of Parmalat S.p.A., Banca Nazionale del Lavoro and Dea Capital S.p.A.

== Awards ==
- 2014: Named second-best CEO in Italy by Thomson Reuters
