= The Original Car Shoe =

Italian high fashion brand

- Type: Subsidiary
- Industry: Fashion
- Founded: 1963; 63 years ago
- Headquarters: Milan, Italy
- Parent: Prada
- Website: www.carshoe.com

The Original Car Shoe, or simply Car Shoe, is an Italian high fashion brand owned by Prada.

== Early years ==
Car Shoe was founded in 1963 by Gianni Mostile. The brand soon became best known for its signature moccasin which feature tiny rubber nubs. The brand earned a patent from the Italian Ministry of Industry and Trade and its advocates included Giovanni Agnelli, U.S. president John F. Kennedy and Roberto Rossellini.

== Prada takeover ==
In 2001, Car Shoe was assimilated by Prada, which soon opened stores in Milan and Capri in the next two years and introduced the line into over 200 major boutiques internationally. Prada launched Car Shoe's first bags in 2004.

Car Shoe's traditional driving shoe is now available in a wide range of colors and leathers, and even in a new children's collection.

Under Prada's control, Car Shoe sales have seen much growth. Its 2005 turnover of 17 million euros ($21 million) represented a remarkable 180% surge in sales from 6 million euros ($7.5 million) in 2004, and its sales increased by 33% in 2008 compared to the previous year.

== Imitations ==
According to Fashion Wire Daily, Car Shoe is one of the six most copied labels in the Chinese capital. The Car Shoe was famously copied by Tod's. In 2014, Ferrari director Lapo Elkann attacked Tod's CEO Diego Della Valle for the imitation declaring that the Car Shoe was the "one that first launched the driving shoes with the gommino sole — and not Tod’s."

== Stores ==
The company currently has its own unique stores in Milan, Rome, Capri, Dubai, Hong Kong and Singapore. It is planning on opening new stores in Italy, other countries in Europe, the Far East and New York City in the near future.
