= Miuccia Prada =

Italian fashion designer and entrepreneur (born 1948)

Miuccia Bianchi Prada OMRI
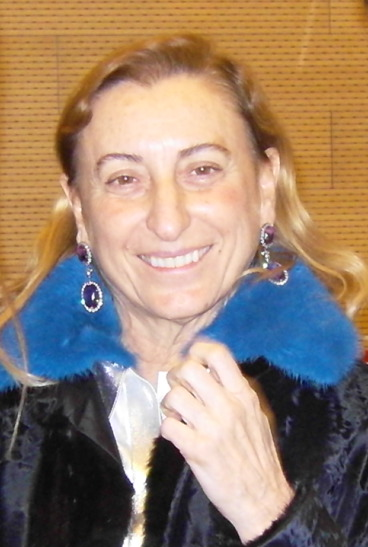
- Prada in 2011
- Born: Maria Bianchi; 10 May 1948 (age 78); Milan, Italy
- Education: University of Milan (BA, PhD)
- Occupations: Fashion designer, businessperson
- Labels: Prada; Miu Miu
- Title: Co-CEO and head designer, Prada
- Spouse: Patrizio Bertelli (m. 1978)
- Children: 2, including Lorenzo Bertelli
- Relatives: Mario Prada (grandfather)
- Awards: Council of Fashion Designers of America International Award (1993)

Miuccia Bianchi Prada (Italian: [ˈmjuttʃa ˈbjaŋki ˈpraːda, miˈu-]; born Maria Bianchi [maˈriːa ˈbjaŋki] on 10 May 1948) is an Italian fashion designer and businesswoman. She is the head designer of Prada and the founder of its subsidiary Miu Miu. As of October 2021, Forbes estimated her net worth at US$4.8 billion. In August 2021, Bloomberg estimated her net worth to be $6.6 billion, ranking 430th in the world.

The youngest granddaughter of Mario Prada, Miuccia Prada took over the family-owned luxury goods manufacturer in 1978. Since then, the company has acquired Jil Sander, Helmut Lang and shoemaker Church & Co. In 2002, Prada opened her own contemporary art museum.

In March 2013, Prada was named one of the fifty best dressed over-50s by Forbes. The magazine listed her as the 75th most powerful woman in the world in 2014, when she had an estimated net worth of $11.1 billion.

== Early life and education ==
Born Maria Bianchi on 10 May 1948 in Milan, she took the name Miuccia Prada in the 1980s, after being adopted by an aunt. Her biological parents were Luigi Bianchi and Luisa Prada. She has two older siblings, Albert and Marina.

After attending Liceo Classico Berchet high school in Milan, Prada went to the University of Milan where she graduated with a degree in political science in 1971, while on the same time studying acting at the Piccolo Teatro in Milan. In 1978, she subsequently obtained a PhD in political science from the same university.

== Career ==
=== Early beginnings ===
Prada trained at the Teatro Piccolo to become a mime artist and performed for five years. She was a member of the Italian Communist Party and was involved in the women's rights movement during the seventies in Milan.

=== Career at Prada ===
By the mid-Seventies, Prada entered into her family's business of manufacturing luxury leather bags, a company established by her grandfather in 1913. She initially oversaw the design of accessories. In 1978, she met her future husband and business partner, Patrizio Bertelli.

Prada's first successful handbag design was in 1985. It was a line of black, finely-woven nylon handbags. By 1989, she designed and introduced her first women's ready-to-wear collection. In 1995, she launched her first menswear line. The Miu Miu line was introduced in 1992 as a less expensive womenswear line inspired by her personal wardrobe. She named it after her own nickname, Miu Miu.

In 1994, Prada showed her collections in both New York and London Fashion Weeks. She had already been exhibiting at Milan Fashion Week. Bertelli, Prada's husband, is responsible for the commercial side of products and Prada's retail strategy. The design house has grown into a conglomerate that includes labels such as Helmut Lang, Jil Sander, and Azzedine Alaïa. The company has expanded into leather goods, shoes, fragrances, and apparel for both men and women.

As of 2014, Prada is the co-CEO of Prada, together with her husband.

In 2020, Prada presented her final collection as the brand's sole creative director; because of the COVID-19 pandemic, it was unveiled in a sequence of short films directed by artists including Martine Syms and Juergen Teller. She has since been sharing that responsibility with Raf Simons.

=== Other activities ===
In 2010, Prada designed costumes for the Verdi opera "Attila" at the New York City Metropolitan Opera House.

== Business philosophy ==
Prada deliberately avoids merging high art with fashion: "Art is for expressing ideas and for expressing a vision. My job is to sell."

== Recognition ==
=== Awards and honours ===
Year	Title
1993, 2004	International Award, awarded by the Council of Fashion Designers of America (CFDA)
1995, 1996, 1998	VH1 Fashion Award for Womenswear Designer of the Year
2005	Time Magazine's 100 Most Influential People
2006	Officier of the Ordre des Arts et des Lettres, awarded by the French Ministry of Culture
2013	International Designer of the Year, awarded by the British Fashion Awards.
2014	75th most powerful woman, selected by Forbes
2015	Fashion Innovator of the Year, awarded by WSJ Magazine
2015	Knight of the Grand Cross, Order of Merit of the Italian Republic
2016	Woman of the Year Award, given by Glamour USA
2018	Outstanding Achievement Award, given by the British Fashion Council
2021	John B. Fairchild Honor for Lifetime Achievement by WWD magazine

=== Exhibitions ===
Along with designer Elsa Schiaparelli, Prada was the subject of the 2012 exhibition, "Impossible Conversations" at the Metropolitan Museum of Art.

== Controversy ==
In early 2014, Prada and Patrizio Bertelli were put under investigation as part of a tax avoidance probe by Milan prosecutors. By 2016, both paid more than 400 million euros ($429 million) to settle their tax positions.

== Personal life ==
Prada is married to Patrizio Bertelli, a businessman. Their two sons were born in 1988 and 1990, the elder being rally driver Lorenzo Bertelli. The couple live in the apartment where she was born.

Prada is a collector of contemporary art and owns several artworks by Young British Artists. She is friends with the artists Cindy Sherman and Francesco Vezzoli.

Over several years, Prada acted as a godmother to a Luna Rossa boat nine times.

== Honours ==
- Italy: Knight Grand Cross of the Order of Merit of the Italian Republic (21 December 2015)
