= Diego Della Valle =

Italian businessman

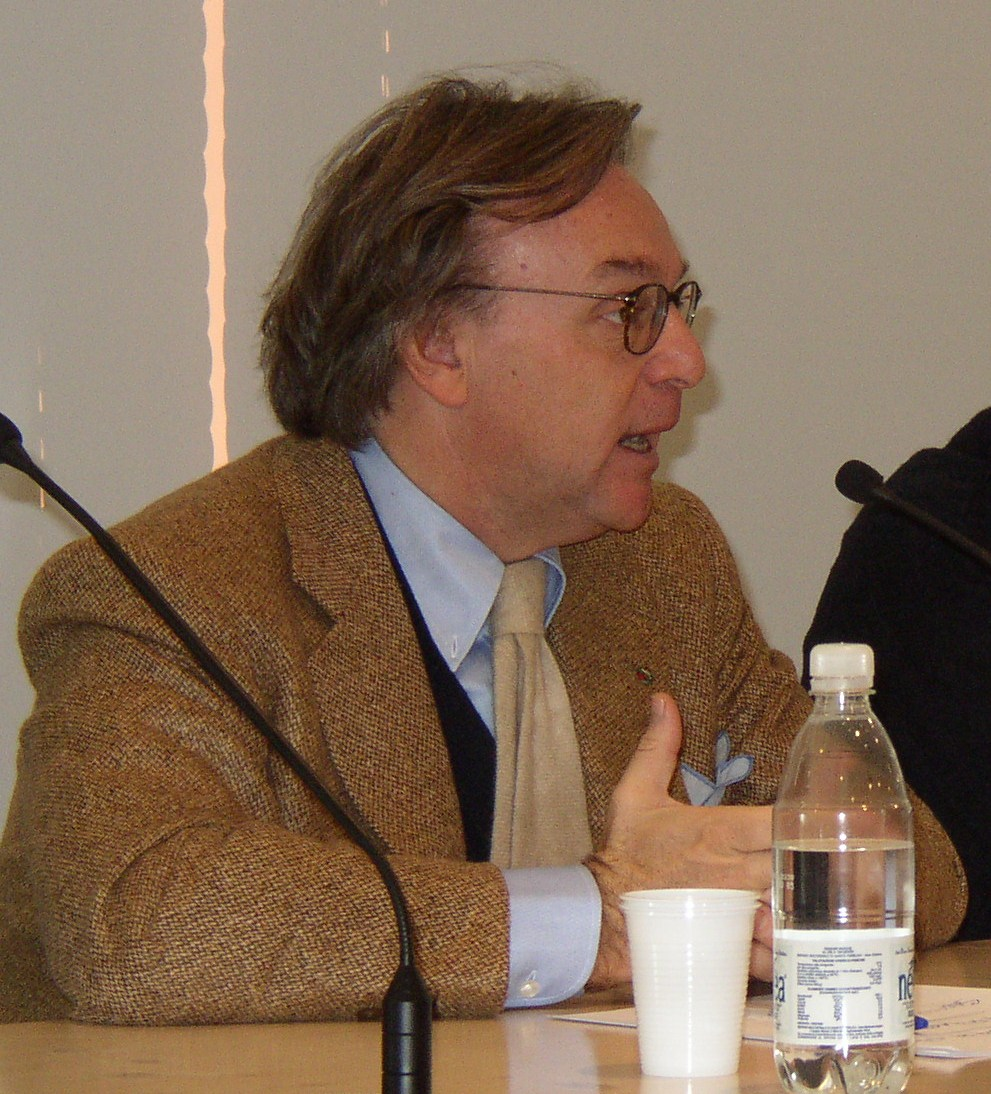
- Della Valle in 2003
- Born: 30 December 1953 (age 72); Sant'Elpidio a Mare, Marche, Italy
- Education: University of Bologna
- Occupations: Lawyer businessman
Known for
Major shareholder of Tod's
Former Owner of ACF Fiorentina
Owner of Schiaparelli
- Board member of: Chairman of Tod's
- Spouse: Barbara Pistilli
- Children: 2
- Relatives: Andrea (brother)

Diego Della Valle (born 30 December 1953) is an Italian businessman who is the chairman of Tod's. He is the former owner of ACF Fiorentina which he sold after a criminal conviction for match fixing as part of the Calciopoli scandal.

== Early life ==
Della Valle was born and raised in Sant'Elpidio a Mare in Italy’s Marche region. He is the elder son of Dorino Della Valle and grandson of Filippo Della Valle. Filippo started his shoemaking business in the 1920s; Diego later expanded it into Tod's.

Della Valle studied Law at the University of Bologna, obtaining a degree in 1975.

== Career ==
Della Valle joined the family business in 1975 and took it over in 1978. That same year, he named the company J.P. Tod's. From 1996, he started converting the company's stores in the United States to J. P. Tod's boutiques. The brand later dropped the "J.P." in 1999 after the brand became inadvertently known as solely "J.P.'s" instead of the preferred Tod's. Della Valle manages Tod's with his brother Andrea.

In the 1980s, Della Valle discovered work jackets worn by firefighters in Maine and created a brand copying the jackets. The name “Fay” comes from a local man who first created the product that Della Valle copied.

In 1993, Della Valle joined forces with Luca Cordero di Montezemolo and Paolo Borgomanero on reviving the Acqua di Parma brand. Since 2001, he has been a minority shareholder in funds Charme Investments (Luxembourg) and Charme II (Rome), both of which were founded by Luca Cordero di Montezemolo and control knitwear brand Ballantyne and furniture firm Poltrona Frau.

In 1999, Della Valle raised his stake in British shoemaker Church's to 9.5 percent, setting off the speculation about a takeover; he ultimately decided against bidding against Prada which ended up acquiring the company. He agreed to sell his holding to Prada. In 2004, Della Valle and his brother Andrea took a 40.6 percent stake in eyewear company Marcolin through their holdings. Through his Gruppo Diego Della Valle holding, he has owned the fashion brand Schiaparelli since 2007. He has holdings in Bialetti; Mediobanca; and Piaggio.

Around 2008, Della Valle and Montezemolo started working on the launch of high-speed train company Nuovo Trasporto Viaggiatori. In 2018, both Della Valle and Montezemolo sold, with all other shareholders, NTV to Global Infrastructure Partners' GPI III fund for nearly €2 billion; Della Valle made about €340 million from the deal. Between 2009 and 2010, Della Valle increased his stake in luxury department store operator Saks, Inc. just above 19 percent, becoming the company's largest shareholder and sending its shares to a two-year high. When Hudson's Bay Company bought Saks, Inc. for US$2.4 billion in 2013, He was said to have made around $136 million on the deal. In 2013, he made a failed offer for Italy’s La7 television network.

In 2014, Ferrari director Lapo Elkann attacked Della Valle in a series of posts including the common accusation that Tod's flagship gommino shoe (launched in 1979) was an imitation of The Original Car Shoe (founded in 1963, now owned by Prada), declaring “Car Shoe founded in 1963…The original!"

In 2023, luxury handbag brand Tribe of Two sued Tod's for trademark infringement after it introduced a "double-T" logo that was confusingly similar to Tribe of Two's logo which had been registered with the United States Patent and Trademark Office since 2013. According to the lawsuit, Della Valle had been “looking for a logo-based T that could represent TOD’S, much as Louis Vuitton and its LV, or Gucci and its GG” but did not have such a logo until he began infringing Tribe of Two's logo.

In 2024, Della Valle lost a long-running battle with French tax authorities who had investigated the company's odd accounting practices during its controversial acquisition of Roger Vivier resulting in "ambiguous dealing with shareholders" amidst accusations that the family had personally enriched themselves at the expense of shareholders. Between 2003 and 2015, Roger Vivier was owned by the Della Valle family via holding companies in Portugal and then Luxembourg, but that the licence was held by Tod's, which was controlled by the same family (with a stake of more than 50%). Despite opposition from Tod's minority shareholders, the company paid royalties to the Della Valles amounting to €52 million from 2004 to 2015, personally enriching the executives.

== Legal issues ==
=== Calciopoli scandal and criminal conviction ===
In 2002, Della Valle bought the Tuscan football club ACF Fiorentina. His ownership was engulfed in the Calciopoli match-fixing scandal with Della Valle personally accused of match fixing. Fiorentina was initially to be relegated to Serie B as punishment but the punishment was changed to 30 penalty points in the 2005–06 Serie A resulting in a final placement of sixth instead of third. As part of the Calciopoli trials, Della Valle was criminally convicted of sports fraud with prosecutors seeking a 5 year prison sentence and permanent ban from sports management.

Della Valle was found guilty in November 2011 and sentenced to a 15-month prison sentence. In December 2013, his appeals were rejected and the conviction was upheld but he was not required to serve his prison sentence due to the statute of limitations expiring during his appeals. He was also suspended for three years and nine months. He subsequently exited his ownership of ACF Fiorentina with Rocco Commisso buying the club. In February 2022, Della Valle was among those ordered to pay over 200,000€ in compensation to the Federazione Italiana Giuoco Calcio for legal costs due to their culpability in the scandal.

=== Mandelson bribery accusations ===
In 2006, The Daily Mail reported that Della Valle had given the EU Trade Commissioner, Peter Mandelson, a free yacht holiday and lavish meals as Mandelson imposed tariffs on Chinese shoes that benefitted him. The appearance of corruption given the suspicious timing was widely reported in the British media.

== Other activities ==
=== Corporate boards ===
- Maserati, Member of the Board of Directors
- Banca Nazionale del Lavoro, Member of the Board of Directors
- Assicurazioni Generali, Member of the Board of Directors (–2012)
- Ferrari, Member of the Board of Directors (–2012)
- LVMH, Member of the Board of Directors (since 2002)

=== Non-profit organizations ===
- General Confederation of Italian Industry, Member of the Executive Committee (–2006)

== Recognition ==
- 1996: Order of Merit for Labour
- 2024: Honorary citizen, Arquata del Tronto
- 2025: Chevalier of the Ordre des Arts et des Lettres

== Political views ==
In 1993, Della Valle supported and financed Silvio Berlusconi’s populist Pole of Freedoms coalition, but soon bowed out, citing differences in values. Della Valle describes himself as a political moderate and publicly attacked Berlusconi for the over-taxing of big business and his failure to support smaller Italian businesses. In return, Berlusconi talked of suing Della Valle for defamation. Della Valle is close friends with centrist politician Clemente Mastella.

In the run-up to the 2013 elections, Della Valle financially supported Mario Monti's campaign. In 2015, Italian weekly newsmagazine L'Espresso reported that Della Valle had registered a logo proclaiming “Noi italiani [We Italians]” to the trademark office of the country’s Ministry of Economic Development, for categories related to a political party.

== Personal life ==
Della Valle is married to architect Barbara Pistilli, his third wife. Described as a "familial philanderer", he was previously married to her older sister, Simona. He has a son with both sisters making his sons simultaneously half brothers and cousins.

He is known as a womanizer. He also has a child with the journalist Barbara Parodi Delfino.

Della Valle lives in Sant'Elpidio a Mare, where he owns the 370-acre Villa Palombarone. He also has residences in Milan, Paris, New York, La Gorce Island, and a 12-acre compound in Capri.

In 2023, Della Valle suffered a decisive legal defeat with the Consiglio di Stato affirming a 2018 decision that upheld the municipality of Anacapri's 2012 order requiring that Della Valle halt and undo unauthorized expansions including a wellness centre, solarium enlargement, and structural renovations to his Capri residence, a property bound by strict environmental and cultural constraints. Della Valle’s defences were dismissed as baseless.

In 2005, Della Valle bought a 52-foot mahogany Marlin yacht formerly owned by John F. Kennedy at a Christie’s auction. For his travels, he owns a helicopter (first a Eurocopter AS365 Dauphin, later replaced with a AgustaWestland AW139) and a private jet (first a Dassault Falcon 2000, later replaced with a Gulfstream G550).
