= Prada =

Italian luxury fashion house

Prada S.p.A.
- Logo used since 2002

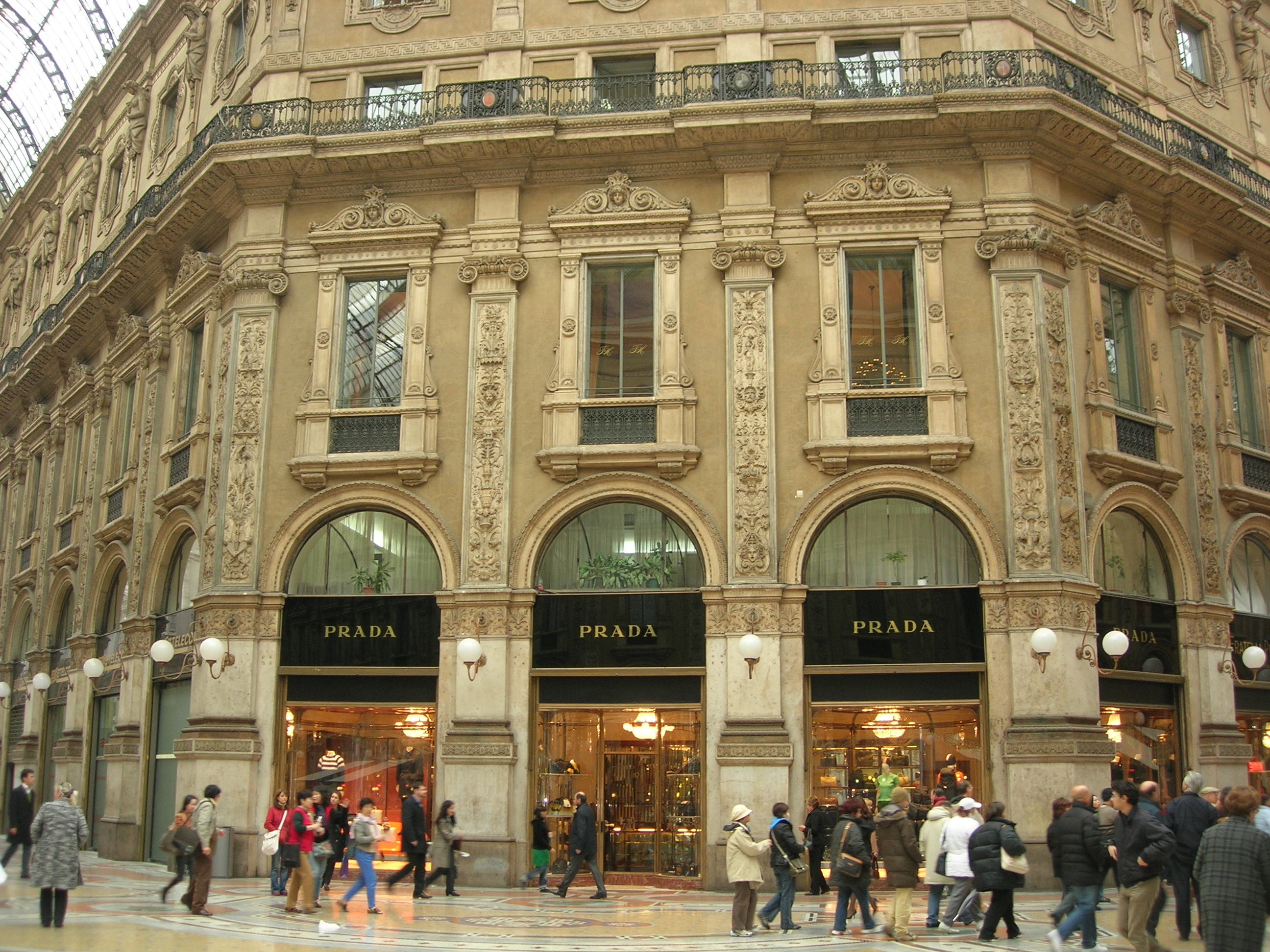
- Prada boutique at the Galleria Vittorio Emanuele II in Milan, Italy
- Type: Public
- Traded as: SEHK: 1913
- Industry: Fashion
- Founded: 1913; 113 years ago (as Fratelli Prada)
- Founder: Mario Prada
- Headquarters: Via Antonio Fogazzaro, 28; 20135 Milan; Italy; 45°27′25″N 09°12′38″E
- Number of locations: 609 boutiques
- Area served: Worldwide
- Key people: Andrea Guerra (CEO); Miuccia Prada (Executive director); Patrizio Bertelli (chairman)
- Products: Luxury goods
- Revenue: ▲€5.431 billion (2024)
- Operating income: ▲€1.28 billion (2024)
- Net income: ▲€838.9 million (2024)
- Total assets: ▲€8.55 billion (2024)
- Total equity: ▲€4.39 billion (2024)
- Number of employees: 15,216 (2024)
- Subsidiaries: Versace; Miu Miu; Church's; Car Shoe; Pasticceria Marchesi; Luna Rossa; Fondazione Prada
- Website: prada.com

Prada S.p.A. (/ˈprɑːdə/ PRAH-də, Italian: [ˈpraːda]) is an Italian luxury fashion house founded in 1913 in Milan by Mario Prada. Prada licenses its name and branding to Luxottica for eyewear and L'Oréal for fragrances and cosmetics.

Founded in 1913 and named for the family of founder Mario Prada, the company originally sold imported English leather goods before transitioning to waterproof nylon fabrics in the 1970s under the leadership of Mario's granddaughter Miuccia Prada and her husband, Patrizio Bertelli. By the 1990s, Prada was perceived as a luxury brand characterized by design originality. To further the business, Miuccia Prada founded Miu Miu as a subsidiary of Prada around this time. The company additionally partnered with LVMH to acquire a joint stake in Fendi; Prada further assisted LVMH in its failed takeover of Gucci.

The brand struggled through the late 2000s and early to mid 2010s, which included a failed initial public offering on the Hong Kong Stock Exchange, though began a resurgence in popularity entering into the 2020s. Miuccia Prada and Bertelli, both entering old age, began a transition in leadership to their children in the 2020s, bringing in former Luxottica CEO Andrea Guerra to lead the company for the years during the transition. The house presently sees annual revenue in the billions of euros, making €4.2 billion in 2022 with profit that same year totalling to €776 million; furthermore, Prada and less so Miu Miu are seen as having very high desirability among consumers across various reports.

== History ==
=== Founding ===
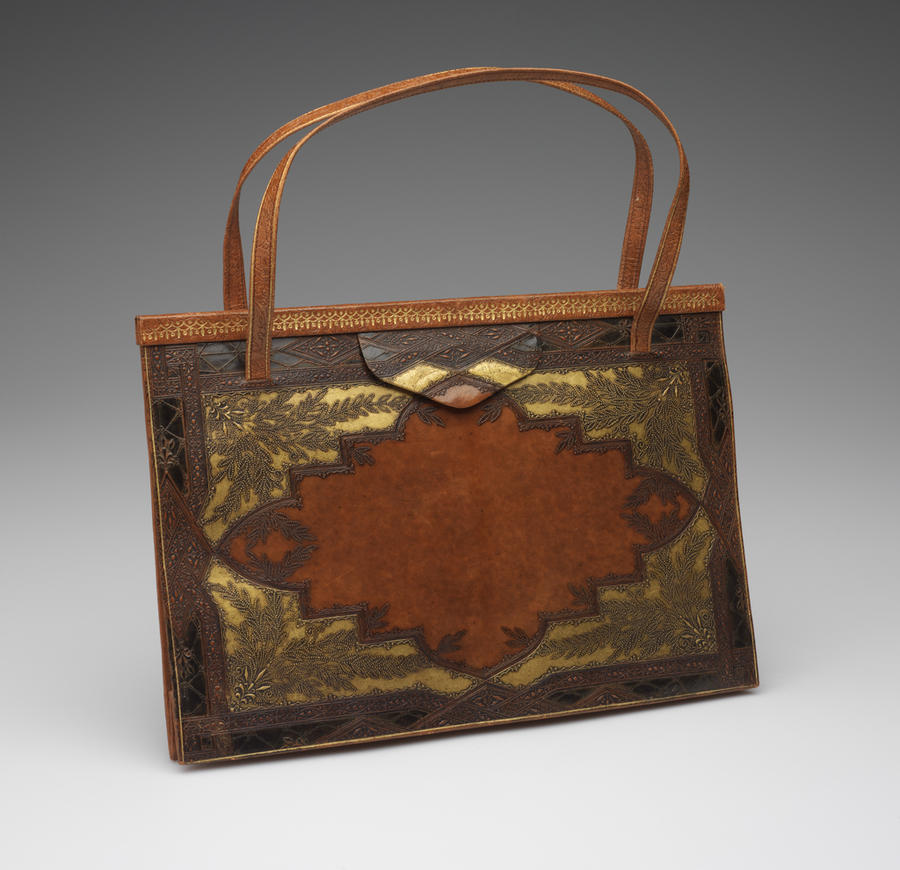
Tooled leather handbag made by Prada, 1935–1945 (RISD Museum)

The company started in 1913 by Mario Prada and his brother Martino as Fratelli Prada, a leather goods shop in Milan. Initially, the shop sold imported English steamer trunks, handbags, travel accessories, beauty cases, jewellery, and luxury items.

Mario Prada opened an exclusive store in Milan's prestigious Galleria Vittorio Emanuele II that sold leather bags, trunks, beauty cases, jewels, luxury accessories, and rare objects.

Prada did not believe women should have a role in business, so he prevented female family members from entering his company. Ironically, Mario's son had no interest in the business, so it was Mario's daughter Luisa who succeeded Mario and ran Prada for almost twenty years. Luisa's daughter, Miuccia Prada, joined the company in 1970, eventually taking over from Luisa in 1978.

Miuccia began making waterproof backpacks out of Pocono, a nylon fabric. She met Patrizio Bertelli in 1977, an Italian who had begun his own leather goods business at the age of 24, and he joined the company soon after. He advised Miuccia on company business, which she followed. It was his advice to discontinue importing English goods and to change the existing luggage.

=== Development ===
Miuccia inherited the company in 1978 by which time sales were up to U.S. $450,000. With Bertelli alongside her as business manager, Miuccia was allowed time to implement her creativity in the company's designs. She would go on to incorporate her ideas into the house of Prada that would change it. She released her first set of backpacks and totes in 1979. They were made out of a tough military spec black nylon that her grandfather had used as coverings for steamer trunks. Initial success was not instant, as they were hard to sell due to the lack of advertising and high prices, but the lines would go on to become her first commercial hit. Next, Miuccia and Bertelli sought out wholesale accounts for the bags in upscale department stores and boutiques worldwide. In 1983, Prada opened a second boutique in the centre of the Galleria Vittorio Emanuele in Milan's shopping heart, on the site of the previous historic "London House" emporium run by Felice Bellini from 1870 to the 1960s, reminiscent of the original shop, but with a sleek and modern contrast to it. The next big release was a nylon tote. That same year, the house of Prada began expansion across continental Europe and the United States by opening locations in prominent shopping districts within Florence, Paris, Madrid, and New York City. A shoe line was also released in 1984. In 1985 Miuccia released the "classic Prada handbag" that became an overnight sensation. Although practical and sturdy, its sleek lines and craftsmanship had a luxury that has become the Prada signature.

In 1987, Miuccia and Bertelli married. Prada launched its women's ready-to-wear collection in 1988, and the designs came to be known for their dropped waistlines and narrow belts. Prada's popularity increased when the fashion world took notice of its clean lines, opulent fabrics, and basic colours.

=== 1990s ===
Prada's originality made it one of the most influential fashion houses, and the brand became a premium status symbol in the 1990s.

Sales were reported at L 70 billion, or US$31.7 million, in 1998. Patrizio di Marco took charge of the growing business in the United States after working for the house in Asia. He was successful in having the Prada bags prominently displayed in department stores, so that they could become a hit with fashion editors. Prada's continued success was attributed to its "working-class" theme which, Ginia Bellafante at The New York Times Magazine proclaimed, "was becoming chic in the high-tech, IPO-driven early 1990s." Furthermore, now husband and wife, Miuccia and Bertelli led the Prada label on a cautious expansion, making products hard to come by.

In 1992, the high fashion brand Miu Miu, named after Miuccia's nickname, launched. Miu Miu catered to younger consumers and celebrities. By 1993, Prada was awarded the Council of Fashion Designers of America (CFDA) award for accessories.

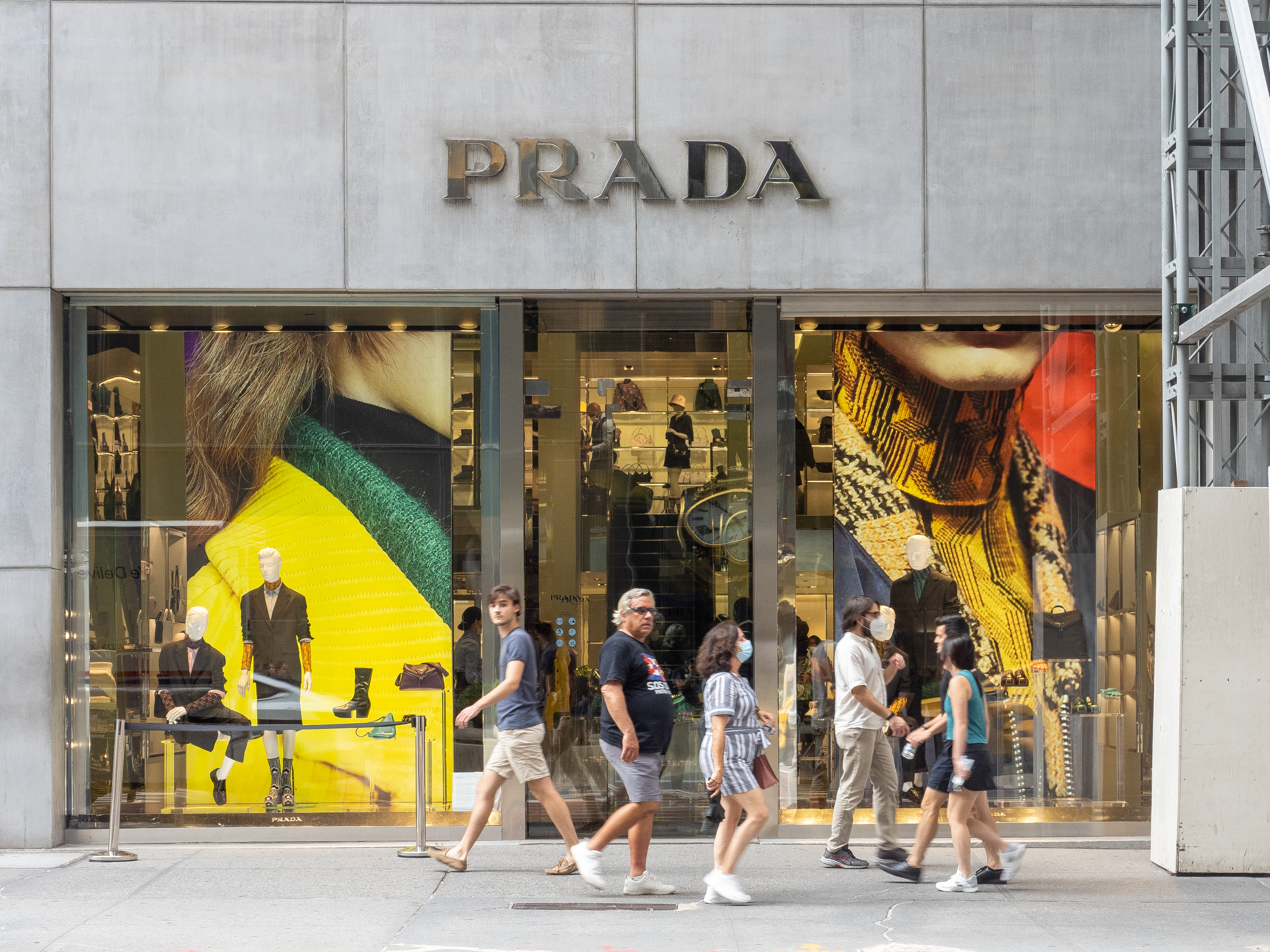
Prada boutique at Fifth Avenue, Manhattan

The first ready-to-wear menswear collection was Spring/Summer 1998. By 1994, sales were at US$210 million, with clothing sales accounting for 20% (expected to double in 1995). Prada won another award from the CFDA, in 1995 as a "designer of the year" 1996 witnessed the opening of the 18,000 ft² Prada boutique in Manhattan, New York, the largest in the chain at the time. By now the House of Prada operated in 40 locations worldwide, 20 of which were in Japan. The company owned eight factories and subcontracted work from 84 other manufacturers in Italy. Prada's and Bertelli's respective businesses were merged to create Prapar B.V. in 1996. The name, however, was later changed to Prada B.V., and Patrizio Bertelli was named Chief Executive Officer of the Prada luxury company.

1996 can also be seen as marking an important turning point in Prada's aesthetics, one that fuelled the brand's worldwide reputation. Journalists praised Miuccia's development of an "ugly chic" style, which initially confused customers by offering blatantly unsexy outfits which then revealed to offer daring and original takes on the relationship between fashion and desire. Since then, Prada has been regarded as one of the most intelligent and conceptual designers.

In 1997, Prada posted revenue of US$674 million. Another store in Milan opened that same year. According to The Wall Street Journal, Bertelli smashed the windows of the store a day before the opening, after he had become deeply unsatisfied with the set-up. Bertelli also acquired shares in the Gucci group, and later blamed Gucci for "aping his wife's designs." In June 1998, Bertelli gained 9.5% return on investment at US$260 million. Analysts began to speculate that he was attempting a take over of the Gucci group. The proposition seemed unlikely, however, because Prada was at the time still a small company and was in debt. Funding Universe states that "At the very least, Prada had a voice as one of Gucci's largest shareholders (a 10 percent holding would be required for the right to request a seat on the board) and would stand to profit tidily should anyone try to take over Gucci." However, Bertelli sold his shares to Moët-Hennessy • Louis Vuitton chairman Bernard Arnault in January 1998 for a profit of US$140 million. Arnault was in fact attempting a take over of Gucci. LVMH had been purchasing fashion companies for a while and already owned Dior, Givenchy, and other luxury brands. Gucci, however, managed to fend him off by selling a 45% stake to industrialist François Pinault, for US$3 billion. In 1998, the first Prada menswear boutique opened in Los Angeles.

Prada was determined to hold a leading portfolio of luxury brands, like the Gucci group and LVMH. Prada purchased 51% of Helmut Lang's company based in New York for US$40 million in March 1999. Lang's company was worth about US$100 million. Months later, Prada paid US$105 million to have full control of Jil Sander A.G., a German-based company with annual revenue of US$100 million. The purchase gained Prada a foothold in Germany, and months later Jil Sander resigned as chairwoman of her namesake company. Church & Company, an English shoemaker, also came under the control of Prada, when Prada bought 83% of the company for US$170 million. A joint venture between Prada and the De Rigo group was also formed that year to produce Prada eyewear. In October 1999, Prada joined with LVMH and beat Gucci to buy a 51% stake in the Rome-based Fendi S.p.A. Prada's share of the purchase (25.5%) was worth US$241.5 million out of the reported US$520 million total paid by both Prada and LVMH. Prada took on debts of Fendi, as the latter company was not doing well financially.

These acquisitions elevated Prada to the top of the luxury goods market in Europe. Revenue tripled from that of 1996, to L2 trillion. Despite apparent success, the company was still in debt.

=== 2000s ===
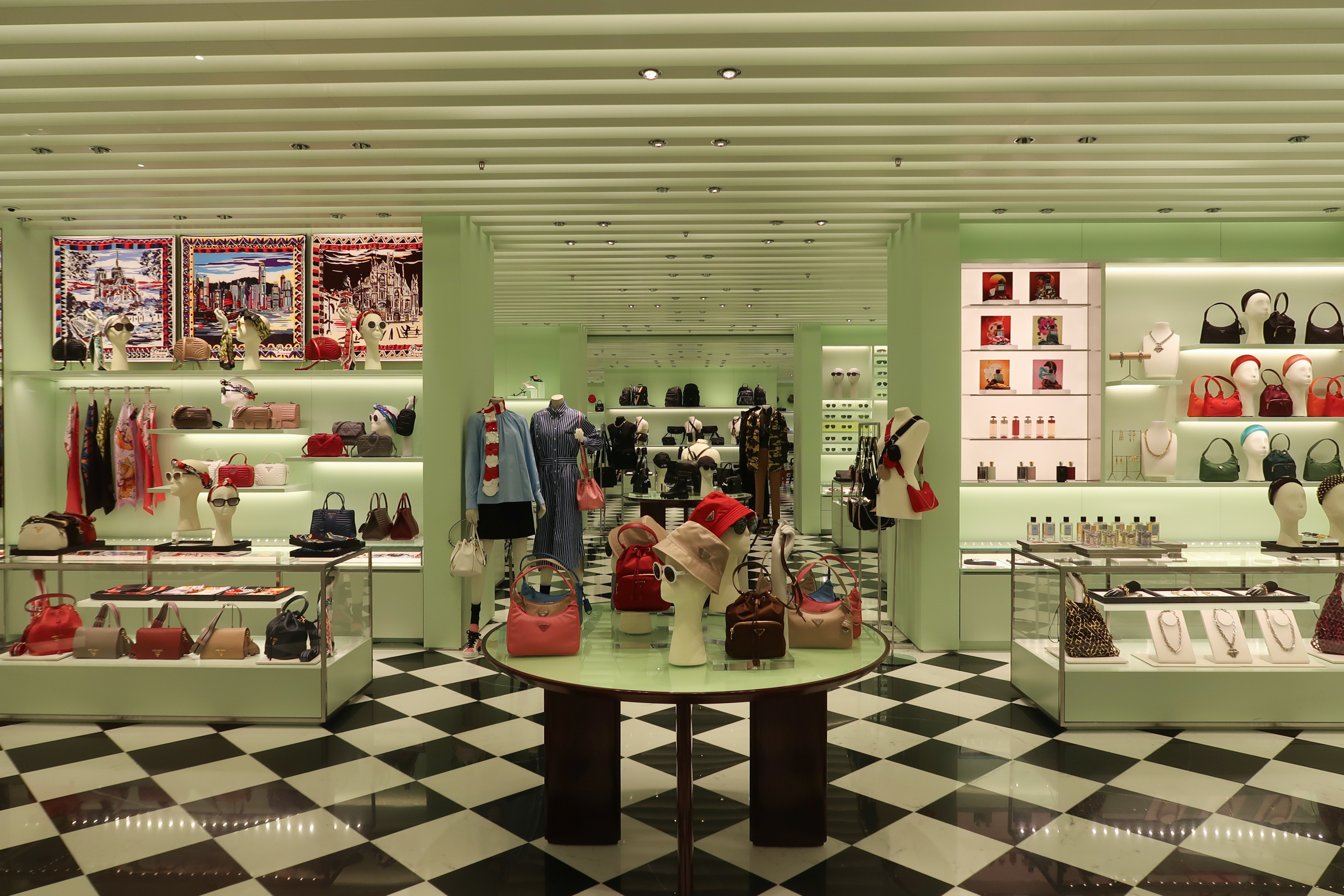
Prada in Pacific Place, Hong Kong

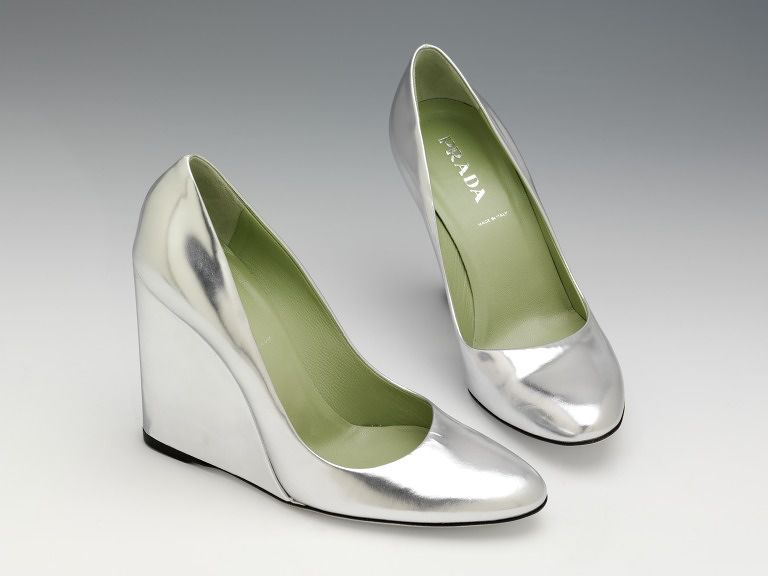
Silver leather wedges by Prada, 2005. Collection of the Victoria and Albert Museum

The company's merger and purchasing sprees slowed in the 2000s. However, the company signed a loose agreement with Azzedine Alaia. Skincare products in unit doses were introduced in the United States, Japan, and Europe in 2000. A 30-day supply of cleansing lotion was marketed at the retail price of US$100. In 2001, the Prada Group acquired Genny and its associated brands, including Byblos (sold it in 2002).

To help pay off debts of over US$850 million, the company planned on listing 30% of the company on the Milan Stock Exchange in June 2001. However, the offering slowed down after a decline in spending on luxury goods in the United States and Japan. In 2001, under the pressure of his bankers, Bertelli sold all of Prada's 25.5% share in Fendi to LVMH. The sale raised only US$295 million.

By 2006, the Helmut Lang, Amy Fairclough, Ghee, and Jil Sander labels were sold. Jil Sander was sold to the private equity firm Change Capital Partners, which was headed by Luc Vandevelde, the chairman of Carrefour, while the Helmut Lang label is now owned by Japanese fashion company Link Theory. Prada is still recovering from the Fendi debt. More recently, a 45% stake of the Church & Company brand has been sold to Equinox.

The Prada Spring/Summer 2009 Ready-to-Wear fashion show, held on 23 September 2008 in Milan, got infamous coverage because all the models on the catwalk were tottering – several of them stumbled, while two models fell down in front of the photographers and had to be helped by spectators to get up. They removed their shoes in order to continue their walk. One more model (Sigrid Agren) even had to stop and go back during the finale walk as she couldn't manage walking in her high heels any longer. Interviewed right after the show, one model declared: "I was having a panic attack, my hands were shaking. The heels were so high." The designer Miuccia Prada, on her side, did not blame the height of the shoes, but the silk little socks inside, which were slippery and moved inside of the shoes, preventing the models' feet from having a correct grip on the sole. Miuccia Prada also assured that the shoes sold in stores would have a lower heel, and that the little socks would be sewn into the shoes in order to prevent further slips. But many fashionistas rightly claimed that the socks, once sewn into the shoes, would be non-washable and would quickly stink and become grey. Consequently, the shoes have never been commercially sold.

=== 2010s ===
According to Fortune, Bertelli planned on increasing revenue of the company to US$5 billion by 2010.

On 6 May 2011, Hong Kong Stock Exchange came under fire for approving Prada's IPO despite the Prada Gender Discrimination Case. Feminist NGOs and Hong Kong Legislative Council lawmaker Lee Cheuk-yan protested in front of the Hong Kong Stock Exchange.

On 24 June 2011, the brand was listed on the Hong Kong Stock Exchange to raise $2.14 billion, but failed to meet expectations reported by AAP on 17 June 2011 and Bloomberg.

In 2015, Prada's turnover was €3.55 billion euros, up 1% from 2014, while its gross operating profit fell 16.5 percent to 954.2 million euros.

In July 2016, Prada began selling its clothing online through Net-a-Porter and Mytheresa in response to changing consumer preferences and the need to reach a wider audience. This strategic move allowed Prada to tap into e-commerce expertise, reduce overhead costs, and adapt to the digital age while maintaining its luxury brand image.

As of March 2018, Prada's sales turned positive after declining since 2014, and their stock jumped 14% at the news.

Stating that Prada would be "(f)ocusing on innovative materials will allow the company to explore new boundaries of creative design while meeting the demand for ethical products," the company announced in 2019 that fur will be eliminated from the collection and all house brands as of 2020.

=== 2020s ===
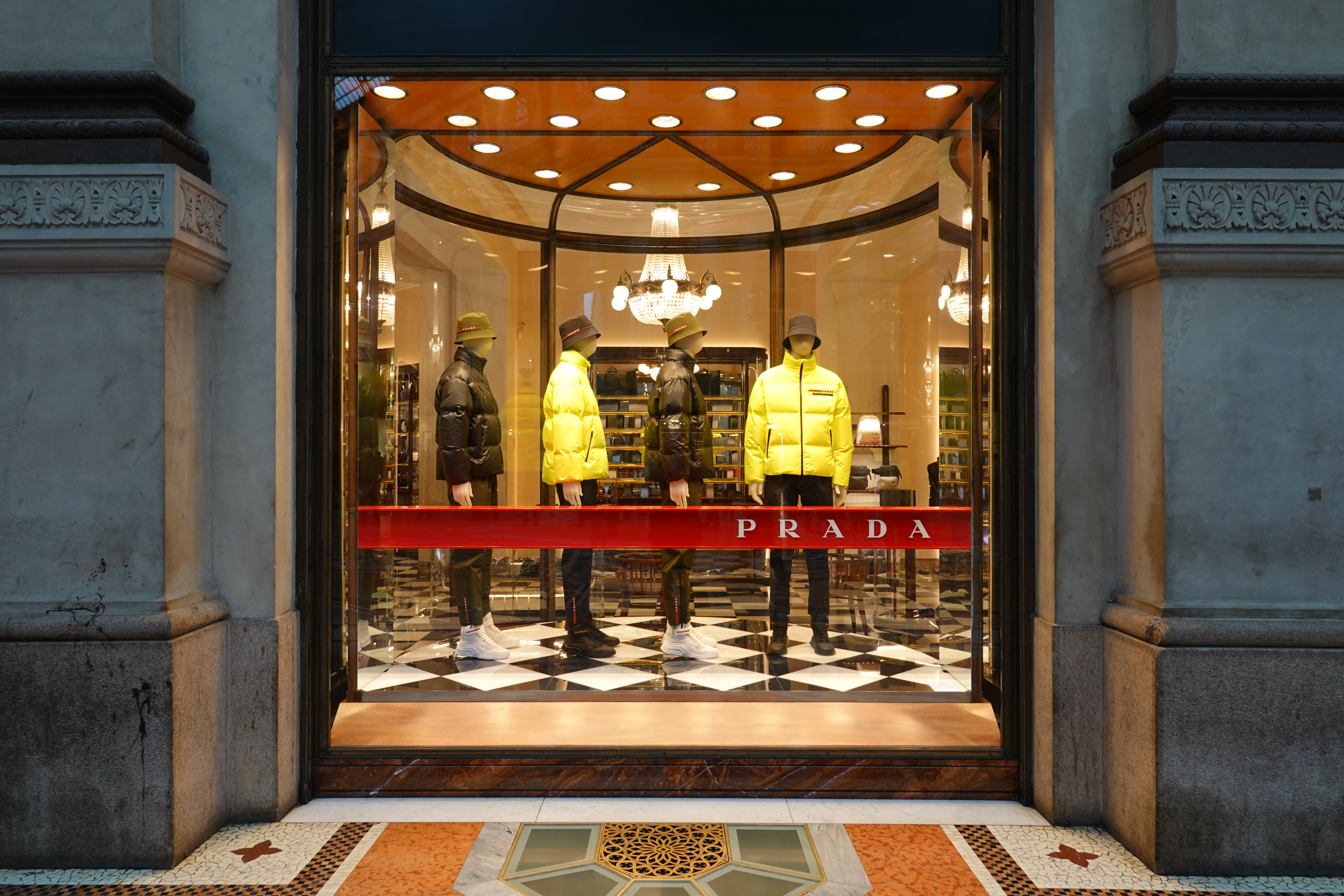
Prada window display at Galleria Vittorio Emanuele II, Milan

In February 2020, Miuccia Prada and Patrizio Bertelli named the Belgian designer Raf Simons as co-creative director.

In August 2020, the fashion house announced it would no longer use kangaroo leather in its products. In 2020, fashion magazine Vanity Teen promoted its Prada Resort 21 campaign.

January 2023 saw Prada announce Andrea Guerra as its next CEO; Guerra formerly was CEO of both Luxottica and Eataly, and later the leader of LVMH's hotel division. Guerra was onboarded to ease the transition between the Bertelli and his children, who are expected to inherit the company. One of Guerra's first moves was to look at dual listing Prada stock on both the Hong Kong Stock Exchange as well as on a European stock exchange, expected to be one in Milan.

=== Versace ===
Versace

On April 10, 2025, Prada acquired Versace from Capri Holdings group for 1.25 billion euros. In December 2025, Capri Holdings announced the acquisition has been completed. With the acquisition of Versace, Prada begins to lay the foundations for the creation of a large Italian fashion group that can rival the French ones. They were previously bought by Capri Holdings in 2018 for $2.15 billion. The new deal with Prada will also include Versace's debt. Prada chairman Patrizio Bertelli said that the group plans to preserve Versace's aesthetics and finds great potential in the brand. Donatella Versace stepped down as creative director after 27 years at the company and is now the brand's chief ambassador. Dario Vitale was appointed as Versace's chief creative officer after her. After one critically acclaimed runway collection, Dario Vitale left Versace. In February 2026, Pieter Mulier, formerly creative director of Alaïa, was announced as the new chief creative officer of Versace.

== Businesses today ==
=== Runway shows ===
Prada hosts seasonal runway shows on the international fashion calendar, taking place in Milan often at one of the brand's spaces.

1988 – first womenswear show in Milan

1998 – first menswear show in Milan

Resort 2019 was shown in New York City at Prada's New York headquarters. The show was broadcast over screens in Times Square.

Previous Prada models include Daria Werbowy, Gemma Ward, Vanessa Axente, Suvi Koponen, Ali Stephens, Vlada Roslyakova and Sasha Pivovarova, who went on to appear in Prada's ad campaigns for six consecutive seasons after opening the Prada fall 2005 runway show. Prada has also featured many actors as models in their menswear shows and campaigns, including Gary Oldman, Adrien Brody, Emile Hirsch and Norman Reedus.

Prada's runway music is designed by Frédéric Sanchez.

=== Boutiques ===
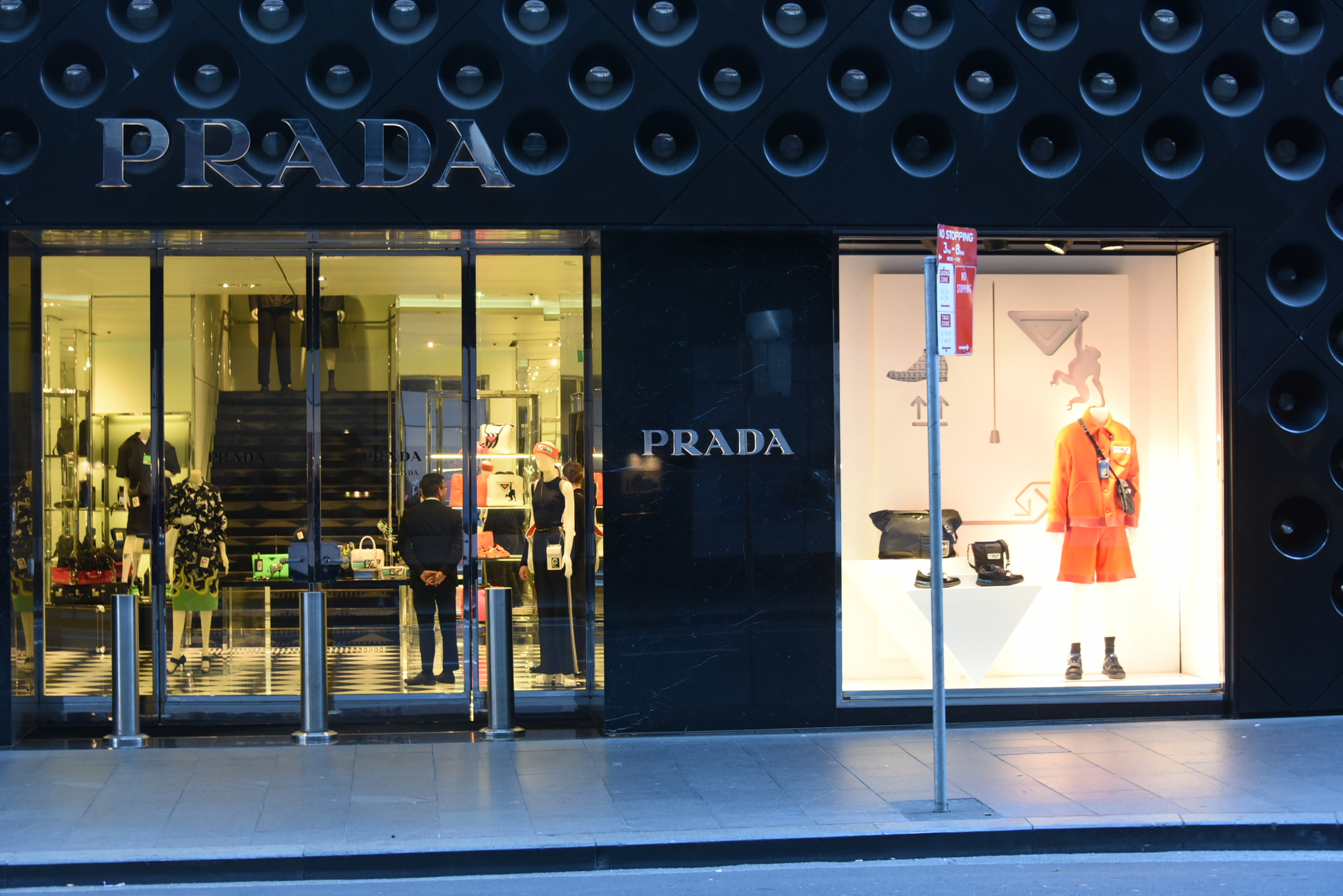
Prada store, Sydney

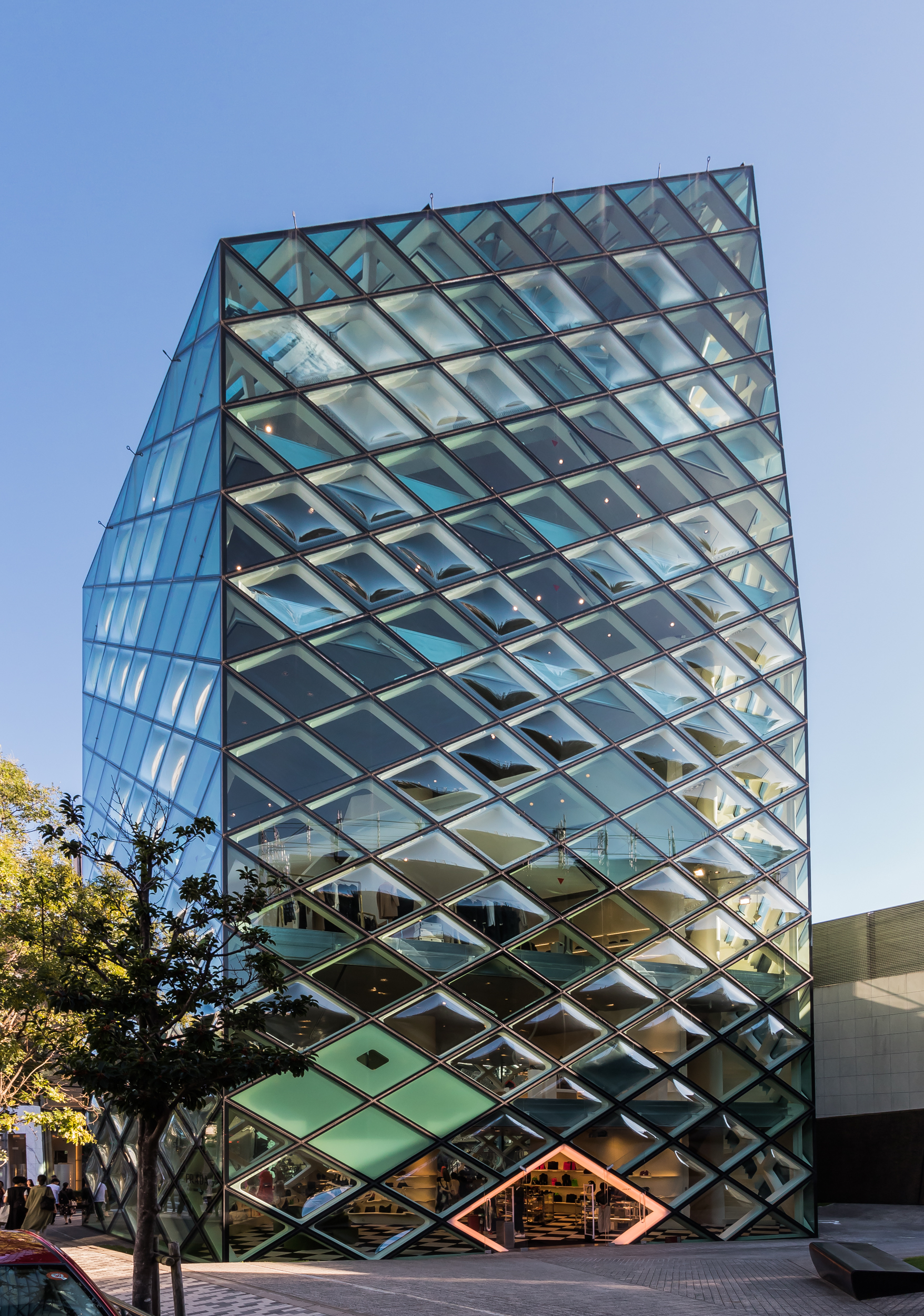
Tokyo Epicenter by Herzog & de Meuron

Prada has commissioned architects, most notably Rem Koolhaas and Herzog & de Meuron, to design flagship stores in various locations.

1913 – The original Prada store opened in Milan in inside the Galleria Vittorio Emanuele II.

1919 – Prada was appointed Official Supplier to the Italian Royal Household; as such, it incorporated the House of Savoy's coat of arms and knotted rope design into its logo.

1983 – Retail expansion sees a new boutique opened in Milan, as well as New York, Madrid, London, Paris, and Tokyo.

1991 – Further retail expansion and more boutiques open in New York City, China, and Japan.

2001 – Broadway Epicenter in New York City by OMA opens.

2003 – Tokyo Epicenter by Herzog & de Meuron opens.

2004 – Los Angeles Epicenter by OMA group opens. Restored in 2012.

2008 – A duplex megastore was opened in Kuala Lumpur at the Pavilion Kuala Lumpur.

2009 – A new store focussing on the Prada Made to Order collection opened on Corso Venezia, Milan, designed by architect Robert Baciocchi.

2012 – In June, Prada opened its largest ever boutique in Dubai's Mall of the Emirates.

== Other ventures ==
=== Costume design ===
In 2007, Miuccia Prada contributed costume designs for two digital characters in the CGI film Appleseed Ex Machina.

In 2010, Giuseppe Verdi's Attila premiered at New York's Metropolitan Opera with costumes by Miuccia Prada.

In 2013, Miuccia Prada designed costumes for Baz Luhrmann's film The Great Gatsby in collaboration with costume designer Catherine Martin.

=== Eyewear ===
In 1999, Prada partnered with De Rigo on a joint venture company, EID (International Eyewear Distribution), to produce and distribute eyewear for Prada Group brands, including Miu Miu, Jil Sander and Helmut Lang. By 2003, Prada bought out De Rigo's 51 percent stake and subsequently sold 100 percent of it to Luxottica for $30.4 million. Under an initial 10-year licensing agreement from 2000, Luxottica started producing eyewear for both the Prada and Miu Miu brands, as well as managing worldwide distribution.

=== Perfumes ===
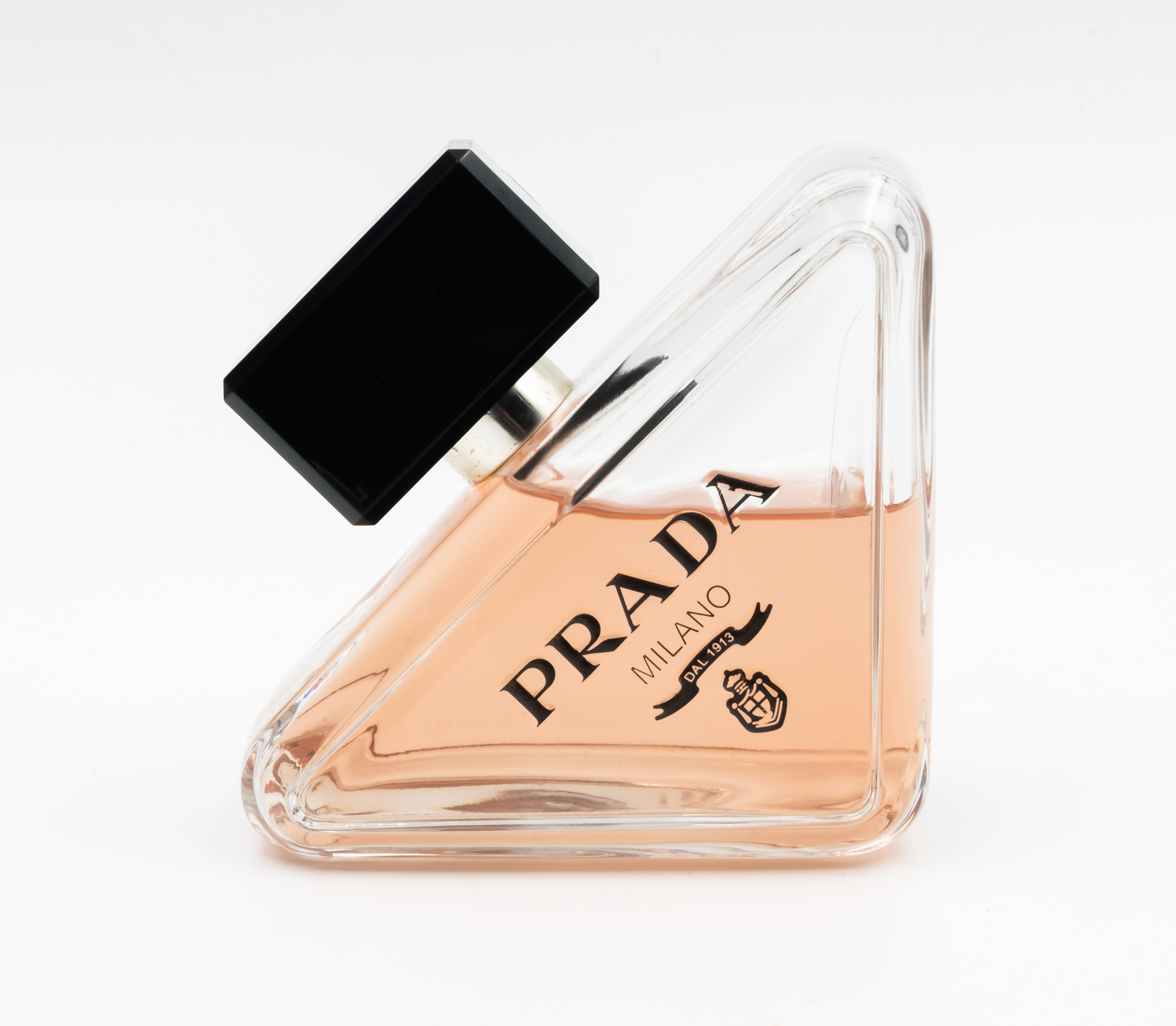
Prada Paradoxe perfum, 2022

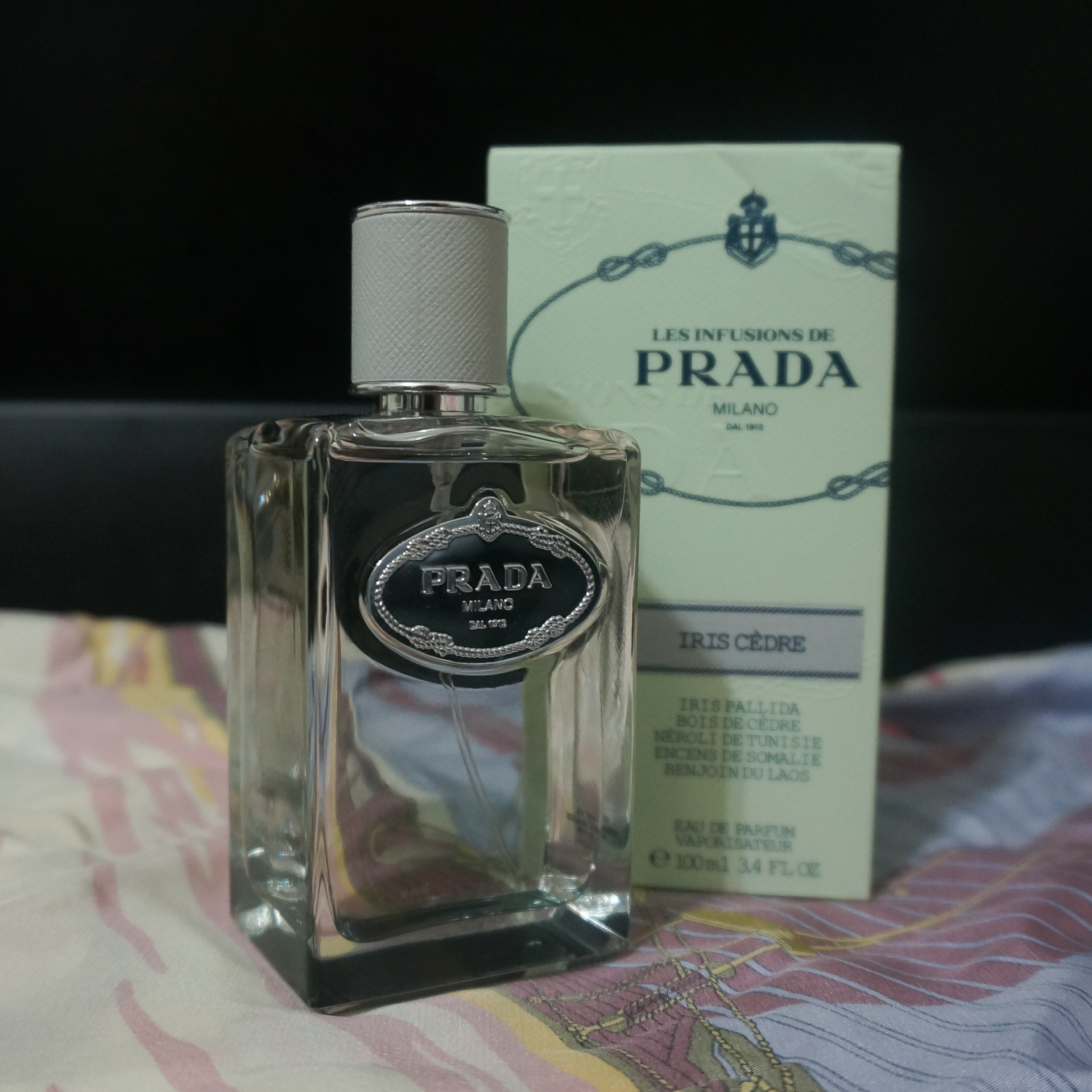
Les Infusions de Prada, 2015

2004 – Fragrance launched with the Puig company. Women's fragrances were followed by men's fragrances in 2006. By 2018, Prada decided not to continue its fragrance and beauty licence with Puig. L'Oreal Group subsequently acquired the beauty licence from Puig in 2021.

- Exclusive Scents, 2003
- Amber Woman, 2004
- Amber Man, 2006
- Infusion d'Iris, 2007
- Infusion d'Homme, 2008
- Luna Rossa, 2008
- Amber pour Homme Intense, 2011
- Prada Candy, 2011
- Prada Olfactories collection, 2015
- Les Infusions de Prada, 2015
- L'Homme and la Femme Prada, 2016
- L'Homme and la Femme Prada Intense, 2017
- La Femme Prada L'eau, 2017
- Luna Rossa Ocean, 2021
- Prada Paradoxe, 2022
- Prada Paradigme , 2025

=== Cosmetics and Skincare ===
2023 – Launched through licence with L'Oreal Luxe. The colour cosmetics are branded Prada Color, and the skincare line is branded Prada Skin. Initial product range included lipstick, foundation, eyeshadow, cleanser, moisturiser, and serum.

=== Mobile phone ===
In May 2007, Prada began producing mobile phones with LG Electronics. Three mobile phones resulted from this collaboration: LG Prada (KE850), LG Prada II (KF900) and LG Prada 3.0. These devices were the origin of the current Smartphone.

=== Watches ===
Production of watches started in 2007 and was suspended in 2012. One of the watch models produced by Prada, the Prada Link, is compatible with bluetooth technology and can connect with the LG Prada II mobile phone.

=== Spacesuits ===
In 2024, Axiom Space and Prada partnered to develop the Axiom Extravehicular Mobility Unit (AxEMU) spacesuit that will be used for NASA's Artemis III mission.

== Prada in popular culture ==
=== Films ===
The 2006 feature film The Devil Wears Prada (based on the 2003 book of the same name written by Lauren Weisberger) earned Meryl Streep an Oscar nomination for her role. Her shoe wardrobe for the film was said to be "at least 40% Prada" by the costume designer Patricia Field. Anna Wintour, editor-in-chief of American Vogue and the supposed inspiration for Meryl Streep's character, wore Prada to the film's premiere. A sequel, The Devil Wears Prada 2, was released in May 2026.

=== Art ===
Prada Marfa

In 2005, a false Prada boutique called "Prada Marfa" was built as an art installation located in the middle of the Chihuahua desert, 37 miles from Marfa, Texas. The purpose of the structure was to eventually disintegrate into its surroundings. Shoes and bags were provided by Miuccia Prada from the Summer Season 2005 collection.

The installation was looted many times after being completed, and the restoration needed led to a revise in plans, making the structure a permanent installation. In 2014, Texas-based artist Joe Magnano vandalised the installation after he altered the Prada Marfa to resemble a TOMS retail store. The intervention included spraying the structure with blue paint, covering the windows with TOMS logos, and posting a manifesto criticizing what he described as the company's environmental impact despite its socially responsible branding.

=== Brand Ambassadors ===
Since 2023, popular K-pop group ENHYPEN have been a Prada ambassador, often sporting the brand's outfits at awards shows and concerts. On September that same year, the Japanese K-pop idol Sana of TWICE is made a brand ambassador for Prada In 2024, aespa member Karina is made a brand ambassador.

== Controversy ==
=== 2009 discrimination case ===
Prada Female Discrimination Case was the first women's rights lawsuit and movement of luxury fashion industry that appeared in the global media in 2010. It was named "a David vs. Goliath struggle" by Suki Chung of Labor Action China. The Prada Female Discrimination Case occurred 4 years after the Me Too movement and was started by an American activist, Tarana Burke.

In March 2010, former employee Rina Bovrisse sued Prada Japan, accusing the company of sex-based discrimination in the workplace, especially for firing women over their age and appearance. Prada Luxembourg countersued for defamation, "to protect its reputation against false accusations"

In October 2012, Tokyo District Court Judge Reiko Morioka ruled in favour of Prada, saying their alleged discrimination was "acceptable for a luxury fashion label." Bovrisse took her discrimination claims to the United Nations High Commissioner for Human Rights (OHCHR) Committee on Economic, Social and Cultural Rights. In 2013, the committee, without mentioning Bovrisse, urged the Japanese Government to enact regulations that would make sexual harassment in the workplace illegal.

=== Labour rights ===
Prada is the main buyer from the Turkish leather factory DESA, which was found guilty by the Turkish Supreme Court of illegally dismissing workers who joined a union. The Clean Clothes Campaign, a labour rights organisation based in Europe, has called on Prada to ensure that freedom of association is respected at the factory. On 30 January 2013 Clean Clothes Campaign reported, "Trade Union Harassment Continues at Prada Supplier".

Research of the social democratic party in the European Parliament, the Sheffield Hallam University and further Groups accused Prada in 2023 of using forced labour camps exploiting muslim Uyghurs in china provided by the Anhui Huamao Group Co., Ltd. for production.

=== Ostrich leather ===
In February 2015, a report in The New York Times by Charles Curkin was published about the use of ostrich leather by luxury fashion brands and the brutal methods by which it is removed from the flightless birds. It was based on a months-long investigation conducted by PETA and namechecked Prada as one of fashion's key brands dealing in products made from ostrich skin.

=== Blackface imagery ===
On 14 December 2018, Prada was forced to pull a new range of accessories and displays from its stores following complaints that they featured "blackface imagery." Prada scrapped the products after outrage spread online when a New Yorker spotted the character at the Prada's Soho store and blasted the brand for using "Sambo like imagery" in a viral Facebook post.

Prada stated in a tweet in response, "Prada Group never had the intention of offending anyone and we abhor all forms of racism and racist imagery. In this interest we will withdraw the characters in question from display and circulation."

In response to the incident, Prada assembled a diversity and inclusion advisory council co-chaired by Ava DuVernay and Theaster Gates.

=== Investigation on tax evasion ===
As of 2014, Prada was being investigated by Italian prosecutors for possible tax evasion after the luxury-goods company disclosed undeclared taxable income. Prada SpA Chairman Miuccia Prada, Chief Executive Officer Patrizio Bertelli and accountant Marco Salomoni were named in the probe, which is for possible undeclared or false tax claims. The chairwoman of Prada faced an investigation after it was alleged the company avoided nearly £400 million in tax by transferring services abroad. Italy's Corriere della Sera newspaper reported Prada and Bertelli had paid 420 million euros ($571 million) to Italy's tax agency to settle their tax affairs. Despite the settlement, an investigation continued. As of 2016, prosecutors requested the case be dropped as the debt had been settled.

=== Appropriation of Indian traditional clothes ===
Prada was recently seen to brandish sandals that resemble Kolhapuri chappals without appropriately crediting. After the backlash from public and business leaders, Prada acknowledged the Indian inspiration and pledged ethical practices. A Public Interest Litigation in Bombay High Court seeks a formal public apology, compensation for artisans, and stronger protection for GI-tagged traditional Indian designs.

On 11 December 2025 (six months after the controversy), it was reported that Prada has partnered with the Sant Rohidas Leather Industries and Charmakar Development Corporation (LIDCOM) and the Dr. Babu Jagjivan Ram Leather Industries Development Corporation (LIDKAR) to produce 2,000 limited-edition luxury "Made in India" sandals inspired by Kolhapuri chappals. Each pair will be sold at 800 euros or $930. The three-year collaboration includes training, skill exchange, and fair pay for artisans, with opportunities to learn at Prada's Academy in Italy. The initiative aims to merge Indian traditional craftsmanship with Italian manufacturing techniques while boosting global recognition of the craft. The 'limited-edition collection' went on sale in April 2026, across 40 global stores and online, with India projecting $1 billion export potential from the traditional footwear.

== See also ==
- Lavender Prada dress of Uma Thurman, a 1995 dress worn to the Academy Awards
