= List of oldest eyewear companies =

This page lists the oldest brands and companies that have been exclusively engaged in the eyewear manufacturing industry to date, across various countries. "Eyewear" is a relatively modern term encompassing all items and accessories worn over the eyes for fashion, environmental protection, and medical purposes, including glasses (also known as eyeglasses or spectacles) and sunglasses. To be listed, a brand or company name must manufacture and sell its own eyewear products and remain operating, either in whole or in part, since inception. Generic optical stores, retailers and factories are not included in the list.

== List of oldest eyewear companies ==
Year	Company	Current location	Parent company	Sources
1750	Dollond & Aitchison	United Kingdom		
1777	C.W. Dixey & Son	United Kingdom		
1816	Campbell Optik	Germany	Independent (sister company: Friedrichs Optik)	
1826	American Optical Company	United States	Europa Eyewear	
1853	Bausch + Lomb	Canada	Independent	
1865	Shuron	United States		
1872	Lotos	Germany		
1875	E.B. Meyrowitz	United Kingdom		
1875	Asakura	Japan		
1877	Rodenstock	Germany		
1878	Gouverneur Audigier	France		
1878	Lozza	Italy		
1879	Erker's	United States		
1880	Marius Morel	France		
1882	Anglo American Optical	United States		
1883	Hakusan Megane	Japan		
1887	Watanabe Megane	Japan		
1888	JULBO	Francia		
1907	Tokyo Megane	Japan		
1905	Masunaga	Japan		
1907	Taihodo	Japan		
1914	Sterling Optical	United States	Emerging Vision	
1915	Moscot	United States		
1917	Persol	Italy	EssilorLuxottica	
1917	Kame ManNen	Japan		
1918	Art-Craft Optical	United States		
1919	Foster Grant	United States	EssilorLuxottica	
1925	Jono Hennessy	Australia	Independent	
