= Lozza =

Lozza may refer to:

== People ==
- Alexander Lozza, Swiss priest and poet
- Raúl Lozza (1911–2008), Argentinian painter, draughtsman, designer, journalist, and theorist

== Places ==
- Lozza, Lombardy, Italy

== Nickname ==
- Lozza, a nickname for people with the given name Laurence or Lauren

== Other ==
- Lozza (eyewear), Italian luxury eyewear brand
