= David Gerstein (Israeli artist) =

Israeli painter and sculptor (born 1944)

David (Dudu) Gerstein דוד (דודו) גרשטיין
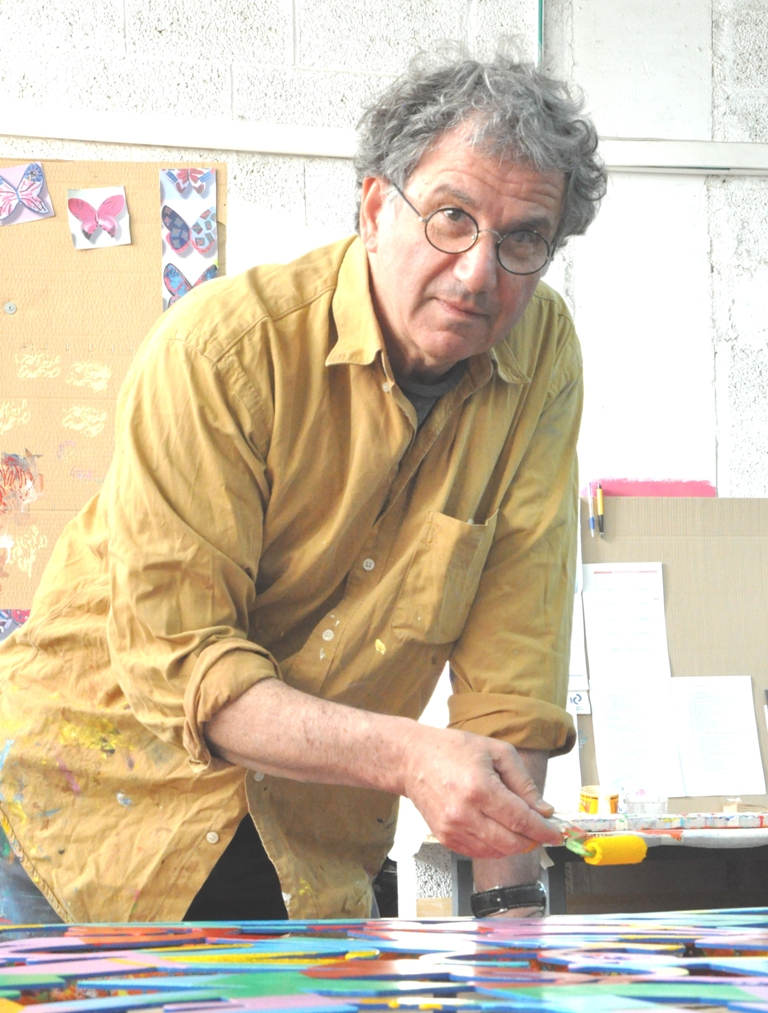
- David Gerstein in his studio
- Born: November 14, 1944 (age 81); Jerusalem, Mandatory Palestine
- Education: Bezalel Academy of Arts and Design (1965–1966); École nationale supérieure des Beaux-Arts (1966–1968); Art Students League (1968–1970); Saint Martin's School of Art (1973–1974)
- Known for: painting, sculpture, drawing, printmaking, photography
- Notable work: Momentum, Singapore; Peloton Wave, Hsinchu, South Korea; Spirit of Freedom, Tel Aviv University, Israel
- Movement: Pop art, figurative art
- Awards: Taiwan's Artistic Creation Award.; Israel Museum Prize for illustration 1980

David (Dudu) Gerstein (Hebrew: דוד (דודו) גרשטיין; born November 14, 1944) is an Israeli painter, sculptor, draftsman, and printmaker. He began as a figurative painter and was recipient of the Israel Museum Prize for illustration. At the end of the 1970s, he wished to expand the limits of two-dimensional painting into painting in three dimensions. He began cutting out the main subjects of each painting and, to cancel the background, creating unique and iconic cutout images, free-standing in space, without the standard and traditional square frame.

That led him to work in sculpture, mostly in wood and using industrial paint as a coating. Through the use of primary colors and subject matters from our day-to-day life, he created a variation of personal pop-art style, which he defined as second-generation pop-art. Following the path of Roy Lichtenstein, Tom Wesselmann, and David Hockney, Gerstein similarly aimed at creating his personal post-pop art style, and left behind the monochromatic palette of oil and watercolors and used instead vibrant, design-oriented colors.

From 1980 to 1995, he created mostly free-standing wooden sculptures, which he later abandoned when he found laser-cutting technology. By that, he pioneered the use of laser cutting in art and was the first artist to use multi-layered cutout steel wall-sculptures.

Simultaneously to his wall sculptures, Gerstein had a great interest in sculpture in public spaces. He created more than 40 sculptures in public squares and plazas in Israel alone. This led him to create many more large-scale outdoor sculptures in England, France, Sweden, Italy, China, South Korea, and other countries.

His art was shown in museums around the world, beginning in the Israel Museum in 1987. In 2016 he won Taiwan's Artistic Creation Award. His sculptures of bicycle riders were purchased by Lance Armstrong, and were mentioned in Stephen King's writings. His outdoor sculpture "Momentum" is Singapore's tallest public sculpture.

== Early years ==
David (Dudu) Gerstein was born in 1944 in Jerusalem to parents who immigrated from Poland. Both he and his twin brother, Jonathan (Yoni) Gerstein, showed artistic talent from an early age. At the age of thirteen, he was sent to a camp for the arts in Jerusalem, which he attended for several summers in a row. Later he took classes at the Beit Zvi Art Center in Ramat Gan.

As a child, he was moved by the works of the impressionists and earlier art movements in history. He frequented a gallery near his home and was always eager to find the new paintings on display there, "deeply emotionally moved" by the art there.

In 1955, at age 11, David was introduced to modern art when he saw, in a newspaper, a reproduction of Picasso's Guernica. The reproduction ignited his interest in modern art movements such as cubism and expressionism. He continued to frequent museums and galleries as a teenager.

During his mandatory military service he painted a series of oils of fishing docks, boats and kibbutz landscape. Upon completion of his military service, David applied to the Bezalel Academy of Arts and Design, Jerusalem, where he met teacher Avraham Ofek, who had a marked influence on Gerstein's style.

== Education ==
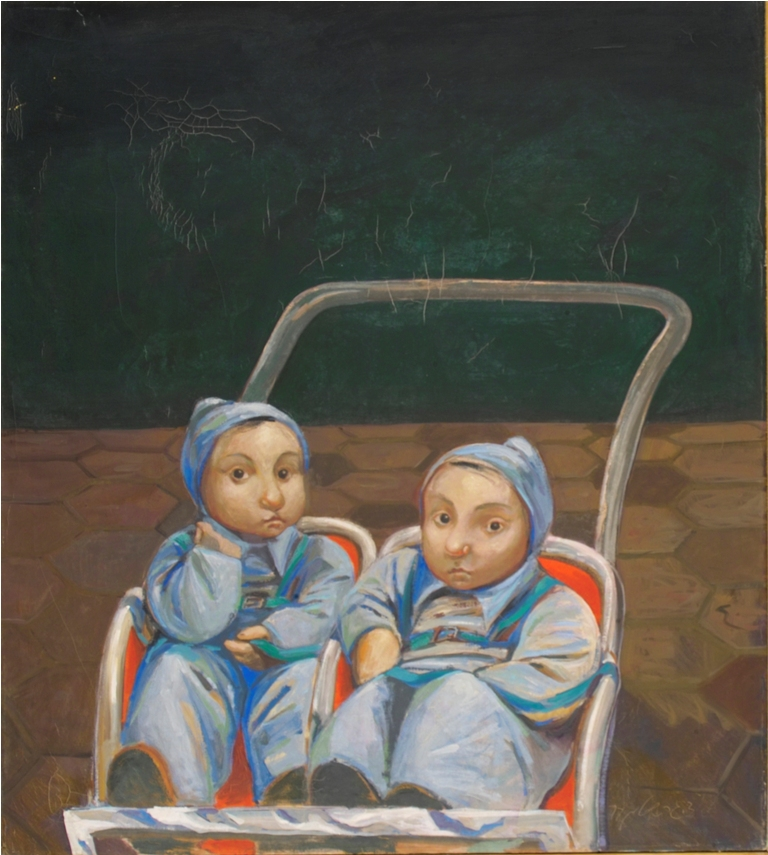
Baby Twins, depicting Gerstein and his brother

In 1965, Gerstein enrolled in Israel's leading art academy, Bezalel, at the graphic design department, as there was no art department at the time. After two years he realized that graphic design did not interest him. Having had a dream to visit Paris from an early age, he sailed to France and, in 1966, enrolled at the École nationale supérieure des Beaux-Arts in Paris, where he studied under Chapelain-Midy [fr].

After the 1968 revolution in France two years in Paris, he moved to New York and attended classes of the Art Students League, where he learned portrait painting under William F. Draper, and oil painting under Jacob Lawrence.

Gerstein returned to Israel at the age of twenty-six and began teaching at Bezalel. At first, he taught drawing and then became a faculty member of the Department of Jewelry Design, which was then undergoing a process of renewal, evolving from the outmoded, traditional style of "Bezalel" to introducing innovative concepts influenced by modern art. Due to his background in the fine arts, Gerstein was responsible for closing the gap between jewelry design and the world of modern art. He introduced his students to contemporary movements, such as Danish design, expressionism, conceptual art, minimalism, and other contemporary movements. He wanted jewelry design to be considered in the same light as contemporary art, no less inferior for being decorative, equal to other forms of art. Years later, Gerstein remarked that his involvement in teaching in the department influenced his transition from painting to sculpture.

Being interested in printmaking, and wishing to expand in the art form, Gerstein enrolled in Saint Martin's School of Art in London, where he focused on printmaking and earned his Masters of Art. Having learned lithograph and silkscreen printing, he sought to combine the two media, which had not as yet been integrated. Upon completing his studies, he was awarded first prize and two awards for excellence in an end-of-year competition at St. Martin's.

Gerstein returned to Bezalel and applied printmaking to enamel technique. Already then, his tendency to integrate different mediums and advanced technologies in creating art was discernable; a tendency that was reflected more strongly in his use of laser in the 1990s. He continued in his position as senior lecturer at Bezalel until 1985.

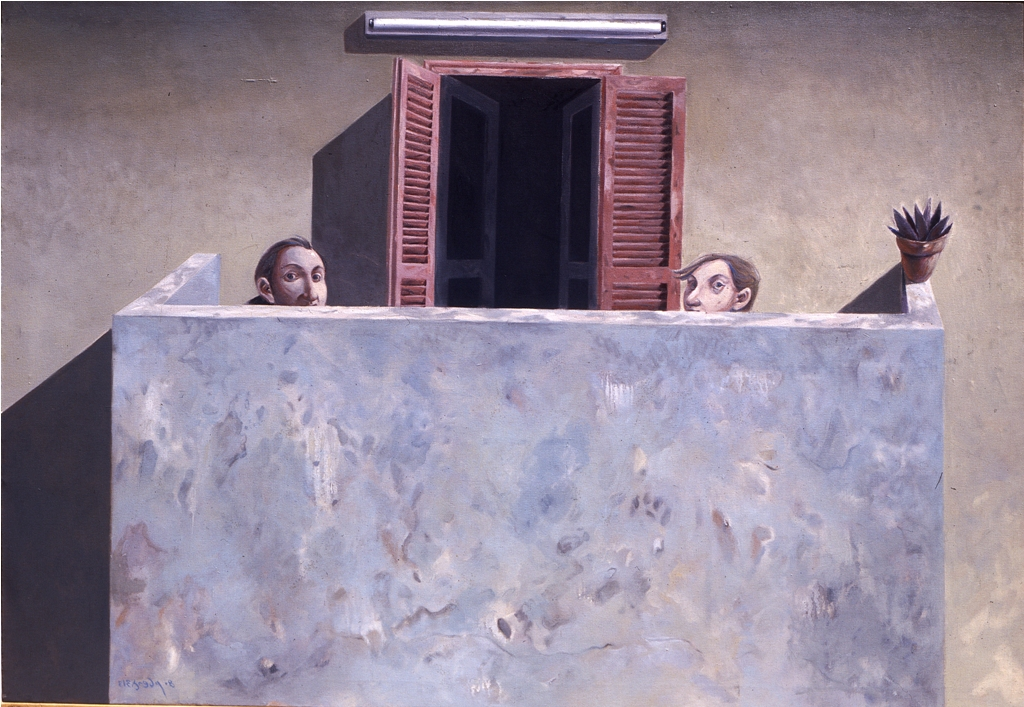
David Gerstein – Fortress, depicting a typical Tel Aviv balcony

== First exhibitions ==
Gerstein's first exhibition in Israel was held in 1971 at the Engel Gallery in Jerusalem, comprising figurative drawings and watercolors. Thereafter, he exhibited at Jerusalem's Artist's House in 1972 with large oil paintings dealing with interiors and the seaside, work that received enthusiastic reviews. Among others, Gerstein was compared to David Hockney due to the fact that "like Hockney, he, too, had been first and foremost a master drawer with an excellent color sense".

During those years, Gerstein led a struggle to legitimize figurative art, unacceptable in the mainly conceptual Israeli art scene. The conceptual art trend was irrelevant for him and he chose the less accepted orientation at the time, figurative painting. Gerstein numbered among the few artists, such as Avraham Ofek, Uri Lifschitz, and others, who focused on narrative-figurative painting.

At the same period, parallel to conceptualism, an opposite trend developed: hyper-realism. Gerstein, however, aspired to create figurative paintings informed by a personal and free style, striving to find his personal handwriting. Gerstein sought to make statements about the world and life, using the narrative and experiences of his personal life.

Gerstein painted memories from his past such as his mother riding a bicycle, or a painting depicting the childhood of twins, referencing the childhood of his twin brother and him, childhood vacations at the Dead Sea, etc. Among his main inspirations was the work of Hanoch Levin who presented life's vanities in a vein of comic irony. Gerstein aspired to do the same in painting: "I tried to express in painting what Levin wrote: relationships between men and women, within families…a sort of grotesque style of painting".

Another inspiration at the time was the painter George Gross, to whom he felt an affinity and who also dealt with what Gerstein termed "the human comedy". In addition, he was influenced by David Hockney, Fernando Botero and José Luis Cuevas, who all dealt with the human experience and people' interactions.

== Figurative painting ==
In the 1970s, Gerstein explored the integration of personal themes alongside figurative painting, particularly in his watercolors and gouache on paper. His works stemmed not from the political realm, nature or science, but rather from early personal memories of family and growing up. At first, these works were intended as sketches for large canvas oil paintings. With time, though, he found interest in working in watercolors on paper only, and they became his main medium. Gerstein created a series of paintings concerning his childhood based on photographs and memories. Another series dealt with the memory of freedom: his mother riding a bicycle in the streets, a motif that developed into a series of bicycle riders in the 1990s and afterward. Another series of paintings focused on interior settings of personal living spaces such as living rooms, in French tradition. A repetitive motif in these works was that a cat, as well as a vase, which, for the artist, expressed, "the serenity of daily home life."

While wishing to express the interior, intimate life of individuals and families, Gerstein was also interested in the public realm, and, more specifically, in the tension between the private and public. It was then that he was attracted to the theme of balconies, as they successfully captured that tension; on the one hand, they were extensions of the personal home, and, on the other hand, they were like an exhibition displayed to the public in the street below. These were works stemming from nostalgia and longing to his childhood memories of Tel Aviv balconies with peeling plaster, and the day-to-day modest life of working-class middle-aged couples, as he recalled from his parents' friends.

Both the cat and the flower vase continued to accompany his work decades later. While involved with these motifs Gerstein wanted "to escape the Israeli political reality to an Olympian turbulent-free, tranquility". In the mid-'70s, he made a series of paintings of people at the beach, influenced both by the artist's childhood memories as well as from observation. Another series of paintings included the landscape of the Ein Kerem neighborhood, where the artist lived at the time, used as a backdrop for compositions abundant with interacting figures in groups and couples.

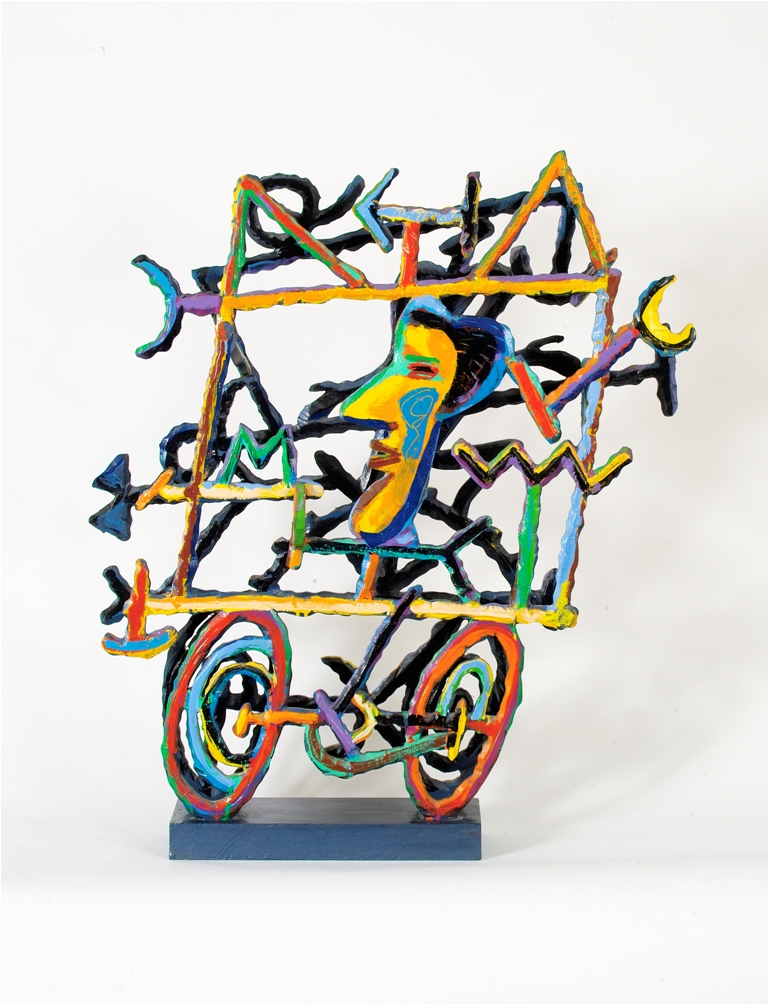
David Gerstein – Vehicle, one the artist's first sculptures in the early 1980s

Gerstein's aim to portray the daily experience of Israeli life came to fruition in the 1980s. Gerstein figuratively describes chapters from the Israeli experience, derived, among others, from childhood memories in Tel Aviv. The first series depicts Tel Aviv with its Bauhaus-style balconies, with a humoristic irony. This series was based on Gerstein's memories of his parents' generation of "little Tel Aviv"; people whom he regarded with wonder and humor. These paintings express the tension between the sabra generation of the children and the relatively "exilic" generation of the parents.

The series contains elderly people, the "old world" reflected in their faces, as seen from the eyes of a sabra child looking at the "generation of the desert"; the generation that founded the country, having had immigrated at a young age, yet still marked by the heritage of "diaspora". The origins of this series can be found in Gerstein's watercolors and gouache on paper from the '70s, parts of which were adapted to canvas oil paintings. In the '80s, Gerstein developed this into another series of paintings, those of bathers in the Dead Sea, about which Avraham Eilat wrote,"the residents of the balconies have gone down to the Dead Sea where they lie about on the shore, covered in mud, exposing their pinkish bodies to the mercy of the sun's rays and the salt and get slowly fried".

== Early sculpture ==
Despite the positive response his paintings evoked, both from the critics and the art world, Gerstein felt the need to renew, find new directions and expand his artistic boundaries. During 1980–1987, while continuing to paint, Gerstein experimented with wood sculptures, which were "three-dimensional while preserving a two-dimensional quality". Gerstein sought to "expand the borders of painting" to the domain of the third-dimension. Dissatisfied with his few sculpting experiments, the artist discovered that he could cut and assemble the elements into a type of sculpture in space. The idea came to him during reserve duty while dismantling cardboard boxes containing cartridges. He painted on the inner partition of a box and then reassembled it. From this evolved the idea of painting on large-scale cardboard constructed into sculpture. Following a number of sculptures from cardboard, Gerstein used wood and thin aluminum. Gerstein defines those years as a "struggle" between painting and sculpture, comparing his relationship to painting as that to a wife, as opposed to his relationship to sculpture: a seductive lover.

Gerstein first showed these sculptures at the Horace Richter in Tel Aviv in 1981. This was a bold step for the 36-year-old painter who had not been known for sculpture previously. The works were of aluminum and wood, and the subject matter was a continuation of that of the 1970s: his mother riding a bicycle, cats, flower vases and various still-life elements.

In the following years, Gerstein showed at two main galleries, Sara Gilat and Ruth Debel, with work reflecting the artist's continued "search" for a new language integrating painting and three-dimensionality.

In 1984 Gerstein traveled to New York, the first time since the conclusion of his studies there fifteen years earlier, and began working with the art dealer Marilyn Goldberg, who ordered the production of six limited edition aluminum prints titled "Art Cats". The series included cutouts of cats inspired by those of twelve known artists, from van Gogh to Picasso and Lichtenstein. In the wake of these works, Gerstein was invited to show at the Israel Museum in Jerusalem. The exhibit in 1987 was presented under the heading, "From Dudu to 3-D", comprising sculptures that were "colorful, cheerful, amusing and reminiscent of toys or paper cutouts". The exhibit was a summary of Gerstein's three-dimensional work of the previous seven years and was a breakthrough for the artist. Most of the exhibited work was purchased by international collectors and Gerstein was subsequently invited to exhibit in the United States and Canada.

== Stylistic development ==
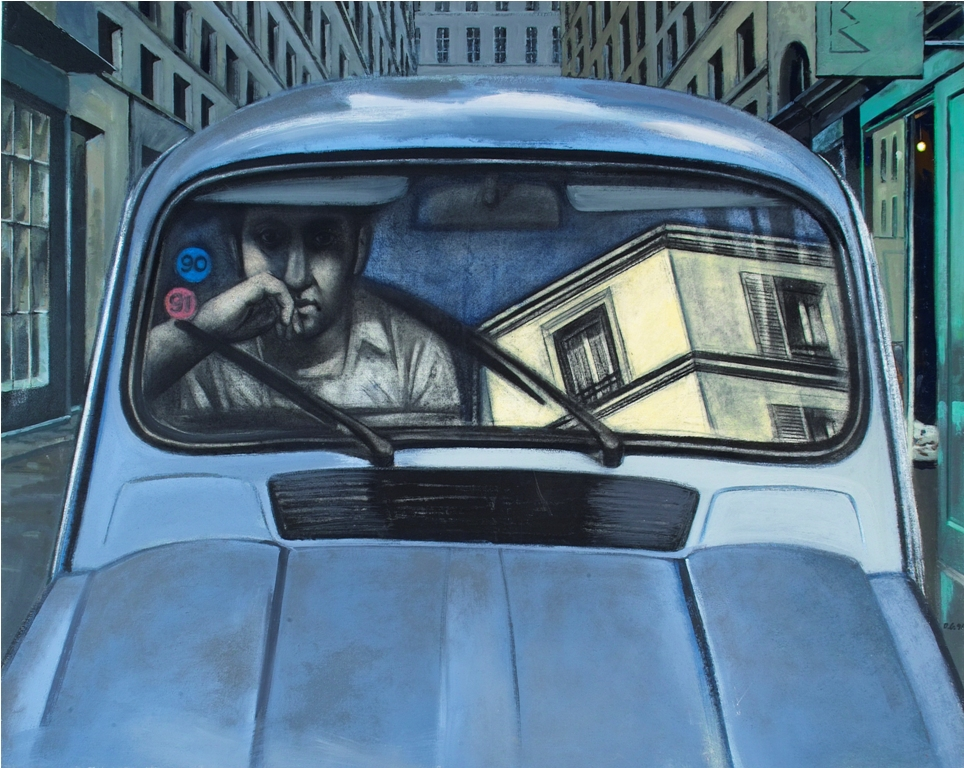
David Gerstein – Claustrophobia, created in Paris during Gerstein's residency at the Cité internationale des arts, 1990–1991

While continuing to develop his sculpture in the '90s, Gerstein returned to painting in the style that constituted a direct link to the balconies and the Dead Sea series, depicted in the '70s and '80s. The series of automobiles created during this period presents people traveling in a car from the perspective of the spectator "peeping" in at the passengers through the front windshield. Similar to the motif of peeping into Tel Aviv balconies, here too, Gerstein chose the perspective of the outsider looking at the driver through the windshield, while at the same time reflecting the surroundings in the reflections on the windshield. The series was created in Paris during Gerstein's residency at the Cité internationale des arts, 1990–1991.

In 1995, after years of working with wood, Gerstein discovered the technology of laser cutting and began cutting metals and painting them in glossy paint taken from the car industry. On this he collaborated with Rosenfeld Gallery in Tel Aviv.

At first, he began working with one-layer cutout steel. Due to the fact that the metal required industrial paint, mostly based on primary colors, Gerstein was attracted to bright primary colors.

Shortly after beginning to work with one layer laser cutout, he began experimenting with adding one additional metal cutout layer. Using screws, he secured the second layer to the first and was immediately "taken" by the technique: "From early on I tried to create three dimensional paintings, which is what led me to wood sculptures in the early 1980s. Suddenly, fifteen years later, I finally found the perfect way to create a three dimensional painting, floating above the wall, breathing, living. It was, for me, an eureka moment. I knew from that moment on that I'd like to further develop this medium."

Soon after, Gerstein began creating these multi-layered cutout wall sculptures in limited editions. These limited editions were nonetheless hand painted, and by that were each uniquely original.

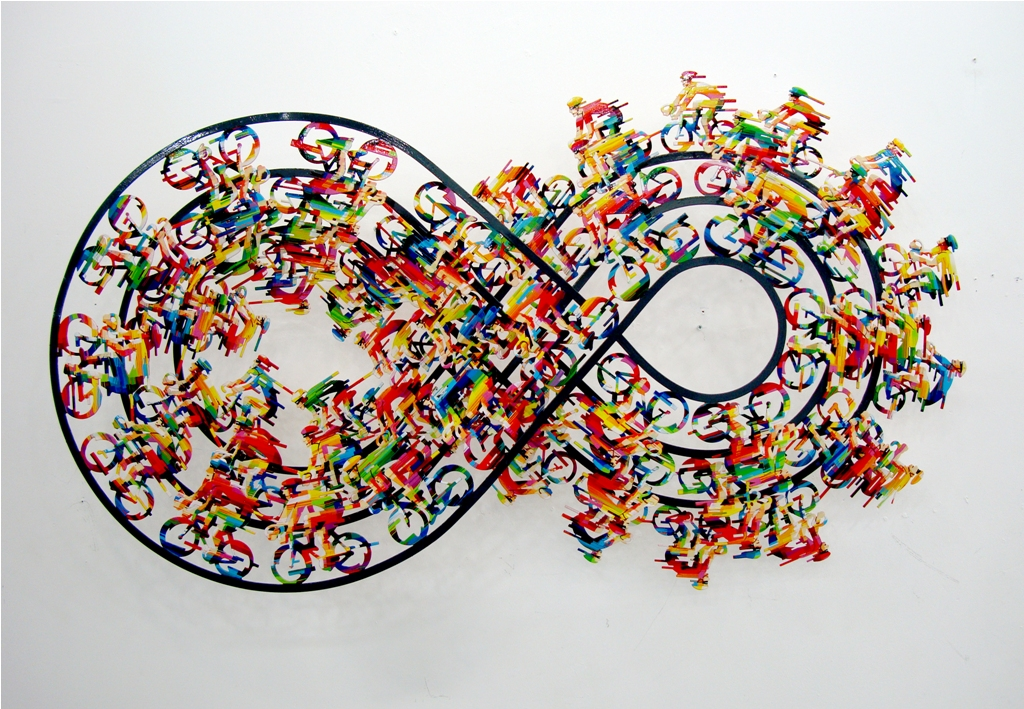
David Gerstein – Infinity Rally

== Outdoor sculptures ==
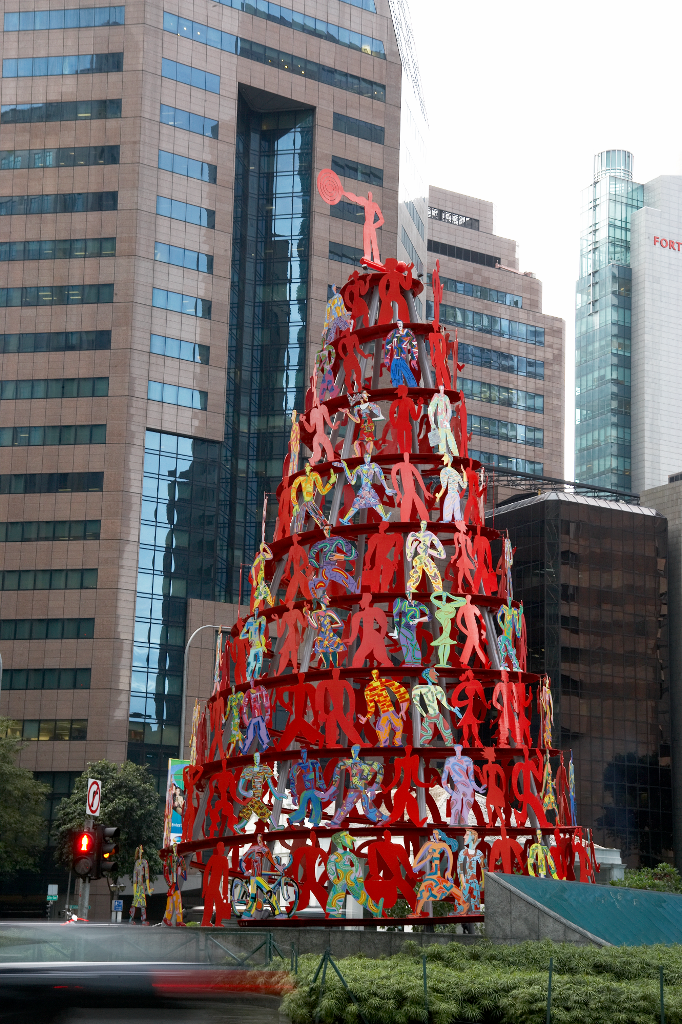
Momentum, Singapore

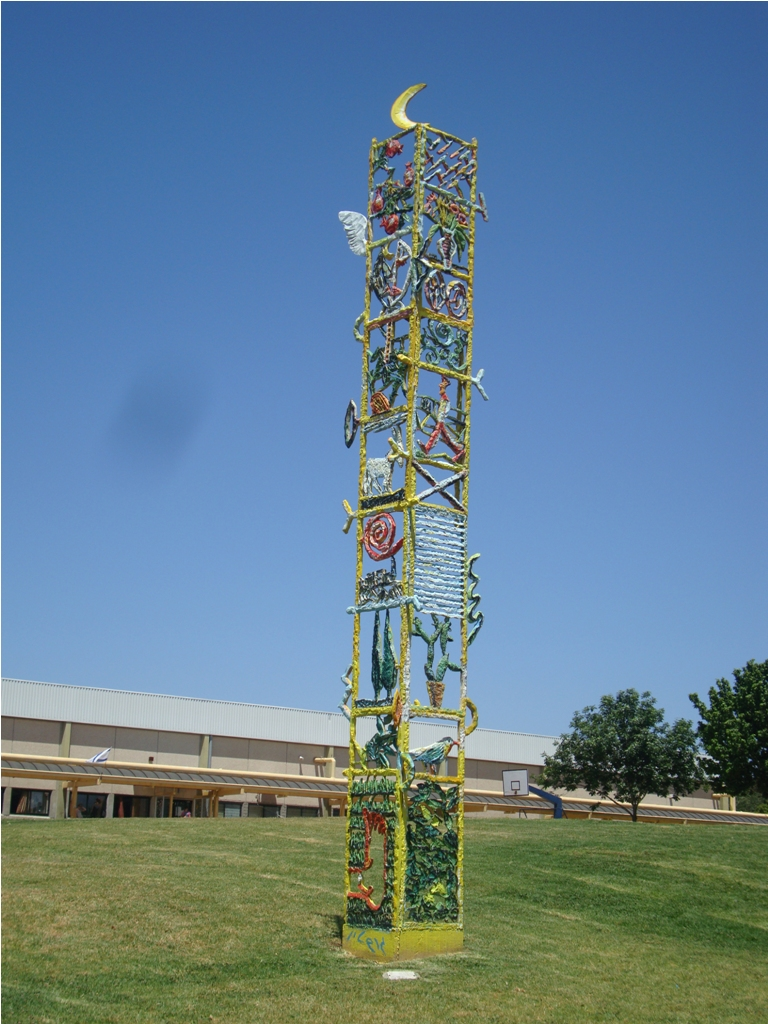
Ladder of Motifs

Gerstein is known for his outdoor sculptures, many of which are installed in city squares or next to public buildings. His sculptures can be found throughout Israel: ten sculptures in Netanya, twelve sculptures in Herzliya, large-scale sculptures in the campus of the Hebrew University of Jerusalem and the Tel Aviv University, Avdat, the Yoav Dagon Sculpture Garden in Ramat Hasharon, Memorial sculpture in Yahud and a memorial sculpture in Beit Hashanti in Mitzpe Ramon, Faculty of Agriculture of the Hebrew University in Rehovot, Raanana, Ramat Alon in Haifa, Holon, Kiryat Yam, Ramat Gan, Ashkelon, Mevaseret, Modi'in, and others.

Outside of Israel, Gerstein is known for his large-scale colorful sculptures, including Roman Warrior is in Bromford, London. In Singapore's Raffles Place. The athletic stadium and shopping mall in Hsinchu, Taiwan, Museum of Contemporary Art in Tainan City, Taiwan; eleven sculptures in the Science Park in Taichung, Taiwan, six outdoor sculptures in the Morgan Stanley building in Seoul, Korea; Star City in Seoul. Five sculptures in a park in Guizhou, China; sculptures in a hospital of Taikang, Beijing, China; and "Tea for Two" in Fuliang Province, China.

His sculpture in the Singapore business district is 18.5 meters high and is considered the tallest sculpture in Singapore.

== Artistic concepts ==
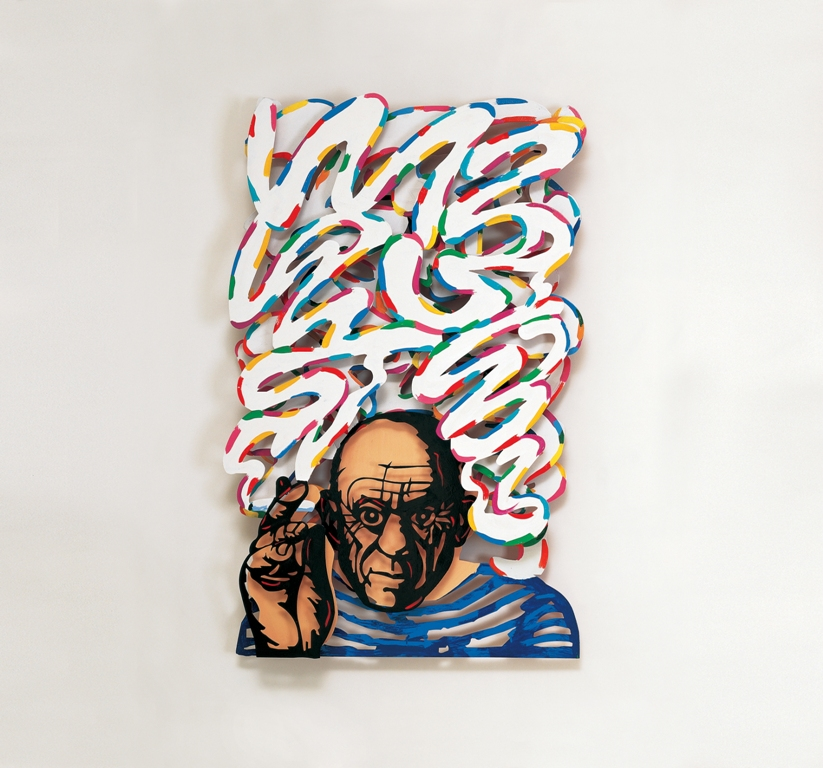
The Last Great Smoker

From the 1970s, Gerstein aspired to create art that spoke to the art world while remaining accessible to the layman in the street. His bold use of color came from a desire to "copy nature." His bold use of colors in sculptures came out of his own philosophy. Gerstein explained that just like the brightly colored fruit or flower in nature attracts insects, so, too, his work was intended to be attractive to the observer; and as the fruit is not solely an object of attraction, but is also a source of vitamins, so, too, his works contain added value. "I expressly deal with images of consumerism and the lure of the color is strategic." His work "Shoe Mania", portraying a woman whose hair is composed of shoes is colorful but expresses criticism of Western consumerism. Gerstein maintains "there can be art for pleasure's sake in which its deeper message is hidden."

Another guiding principle in Gerstein's work is leaving the boundaries of the gallery: "I want to break the unnatural division between the museum and the street."

Gerstein's use of vibrant, bright colors has been called "decorative" and "commercial." Gerstein says: "The forms and colors in my work are my way of communicating. Those who taste the fruit will discover that it is not only beautiful, but also replete with vitamins. My work The Human Circle resembles a huge flower or bouquet, but beneath the surface is a tacit criticism of human life; the insight that we come from nowhere, are going nowhere, and in the meantime, are going around in circles, chasing our tails. Whoever chooses to see the work as a decorative bouquet, is welcome. But if you look at the characters comprising the Human Circle, you will see that they are not pretty. In fact, they are even ugly. But the overall picture is beautiful and seductive".

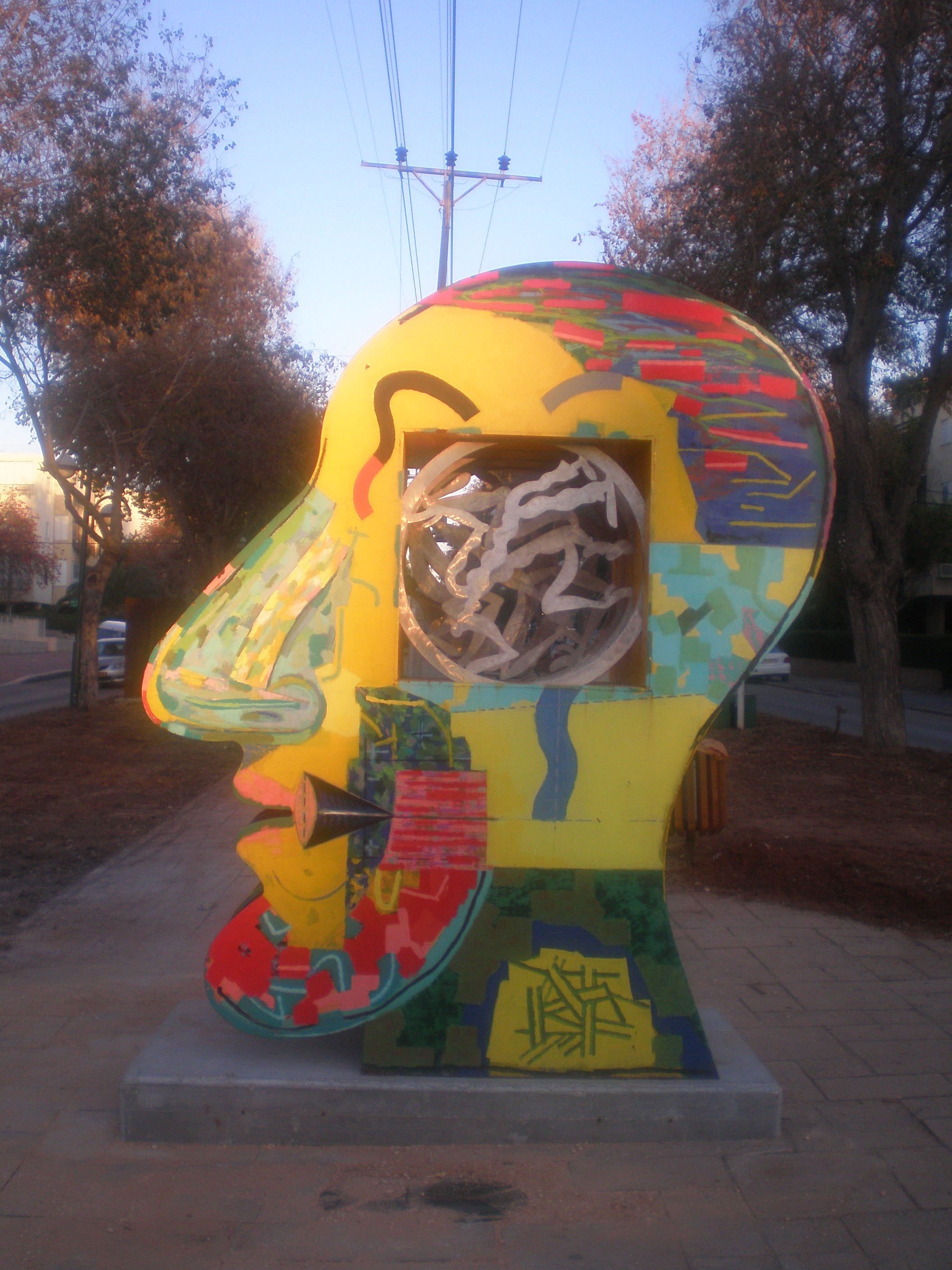
A sculpture by David Gerstein in a Sculpture garden in Ramat Hasharon, Israel

== Selected solo exhibitions ==
- 1971 Engel Gallery, Jerusalem.
- 1972 The Artists' House, Jerusalem.
- 1980 Horace Richter Gallery, Tel Aviv.
- 1982 Horace Richter Gallery, Tel Aviv.
- 1984 Radius Gallery, Tel Aviv (a member of Radius Group).
- 1987 Israel Museum, Jerusalem ("From Dudu to 3-D") Albert White Gallery, Toronto.
- 1988 Haifa Museum of Contemporary Art ("Frames").
- 1989 Herzliya Museum ("Totems") – Albert White Gallery, Toronto – "Art 20" International Art Fair, Basel.
- 1992 Yavneh Art Workshop ("Pupils") – "Art Frankfurt" International Art Fair.
- 1993 Ashdod Museum ("Extended Pupils").
- 1994 Rosenfeld Gallery, Tel Aviv ("Cutouts").
- 1995 "Art Multiple", Düsseldorf Conzen Gallery, Düsseldorf.
- 1997 "Encircled People", Rosenfeld Gallery, Tel Aviv – Conzen Gallery, Düsseldorf
- 1999 Newbury Fine Art Gallery, Boston – Stricoff Gallery, New York – Aduko France Fine Art, Lyon – Art Symbol, Paris – Art Seiler, St Paul de Vence.
- 2001 Galleria Silecchia, Sarasota, New York – Newbury Fine Art, Boston.
- 2001 "Tango Sur Seine", paintings, Artists House, Jerusalem.
- 2001 "Pixul", Art Gallery at The Memorial Center, Kiryat Tivon.
- 2001 "The Private Sector", Meirov Municipal Art Gallery, Holon.
- 2002 Osklen Multimedia Space, Ipanema, Rio de Janeiro, Brazil.
- 2002 Peter's Gallery, Nicosia, Cyprus.
- 2002 "No Favorite Color", Street Installation during Documenta, Kassel, Germany.
- 2003 Nord L/B Gallery, Hannover, Germany.
- 2003 Clube A Hebrica, Sao-Paulo, Brazil
- 2004 Galerie Am-Dom, Wetzlar, Germany
- 2004 "In constant movement" Municipal Gallery, Ness-Tsiona, Israel
- 2004 Galeria Kreisler, Madrid, Spain
- 2006 Due-Diligence, Städtische Galerie im Park, Viersen, Germany
- 2007 Gana art gallery, Seoul, Korea
- 2007 Gallery Ermanno Tedeschi, Milan, Italy
- 2007 Catto Gallery, England
- 2008 Gana art gallery, Seoul, Korea
- 2008 Ermanno Tedeschi Gallery, Rome, Italy
- 2008 Mairie de Hesperange – Luxembourg
- 2008 Gana Gallery, Busan – Korea
- 2009 Momentum Art Gallery, Knokke, Belgium
- 2010 "Sea, Mud & Salt", Drawings exhibition, The National Maritime Museum, Haifa, Israel
- 2010 Celebrating Forms And Colors, Gallery Ostendorff, Münster Germany
- 2010 Mathematician Museum, Gissen, Germany
- 2010 National Museum, Brasilia, Brazil
- 2010 Guang Xiang, Taipei, Taiwan
- 2012 Guzzini Center, Milan, Italy
- 2013 Belle Art Gallery, Denmark
- 2013 "Synergy" National Tsing Hua University Arts Center, Hsinchu, Taiwan
- 2013 Gana Art Gallery, Seoul, S. Korea
- 2013 Guzzini Center, Milano, Italy
- 2013 Ermano Tedeschi, Rome, Italy
- 2014 Galeria de Arte Salduba, Saragoza, Spain
- 2014 HTC Gallery, Taipei, Taiwan
- 2014 Gallery Momentum at Bocholtz, Liege, Belgium
- 2014 The Visual Arts Center Gallery, New Delhi, India
- 2014 "Poetic Mirror", ARTN SPACE, Shanghai, China
- 2014 Catto Gallery, London, England
- 2014 Biac Art, Beijing, China
- 2014 Ostendorf Gallery, Munster, Germany
- 2014 Gallery of Natural Tsing Hua University, Taiwan
- 2014 Salduba, Zaragoza, Spain
- 2015 "Made In Germany", Work of collaboration – Gerstein / Otmar Alt Foundation, Bochum, Germany
- 2015 Galerie Dárt Perbet, Annecy, France
- 2015 Galerie Montmartre, Paris, France
- 2015 Miva Gallery, Stockholm
- 2016 Shenzhen Mix C, China
- 2016 Gana Gallery, Busan, S. Korea
- 2016 Galeria D`Art Mar, Barcelona
- 2017 "Layers" – Today Art Museum, Beijing, China
- 2017 Kellerman Gallery, Düsseldorf, Germany
- 2017 Kpopulous Gallery, Mykonos, Greece
- 2018 Froots Gallery at 978 Beijing, China
- 2018 "XYZ" Galerie Duret, Paris, Brussels, France
- 2019 "SMALL IS BEAUTIFUL" – Froots Gallery, Shanghai, China
- 2019 "BACK & FORTH" – Miva Gallery, Gothenburg / Malmö, Sweden
- 2019 Belle Gallery, Denmark
- 2020 "Art in Motion", Galerie Duret, Paris & Brussels, France & Belgium
- 2020 "U-Turn", Artists' House, Tel Aviv
- 2021 "Urban Dream", Galerie Duret, Brussels & Paris, Belgium & France

== Selected art in public spaces ==
- 1985 "Bicycle Rider", Hebrew University, Mount Scopus, Jerusalem.
- 1988 Sculptural children's playground, Weiller Park, Jerusalem.
- 1989 "The White Rider", City of Lod.
- 1992 "Kiosk", Israel Museum, Jerusalem
- 1992 Six sculptures at Avdat archeological site, the Negev.
- 1993 "Great Tree", billboard project in Ramat Hasharon
- 1994 "Ladder of Motives", Open Museum, Tefen.
- 1995 Two wall pieces for Bank Leumi, Tel Aviv – "The Flower Vase", Bank Leumi, Rehovot
- 1995 "Jacob's Ladder", Israel Festival, Jerusalem.
- 1995 Tree of Donors, The Science Museum, Jerusalem.
- 1996 "Scientific Orange", Rehovot shopping & central bus station & City Hall
- 1996 "Head Within a Head", the Hebrew University, Jerusalem
- 1996 "Island of Flowers", Brigada Street, Herzliya.
- 1997 "Above the Head", Installation, Hebrew University Givat Ram, Jerusalem
- 1997 "Pupils", Dizengoff Street, Tel Aviv.
- 1998 "Cow", Raanana Park, Raanana.
- 1998 "Roman Warrior", Bromford, London
- 1998 "Cats Hill", Neve Amal, Herzliya.
- 1999 "A Whole World", Hebrew University, Jerusalem
- 1999 Homage to Nathan Alterman, Dizengoff Street, Tel Aviv.
- 2000 "Audience", Jerusalem Theater, Jerusalem.
- 2000 Seven large-scale wall sculptures, Azrieli shopping mall, Tel Aviv.
- 2001 "Day and Night", Azrieli Center, Tel Aviv.
- 2001 "Colors from Nature", Horev Center, Haifa.
- 2001 "Things that come from the Heart", Ramat Alon Park, Haifa.
- 2002 "Soul Bird", Holon.
- 2002 "Digital Sabra", Waddi Nisnass, Haifa.
- 2002 "No Favorite Color", Kassel, Germany.
- 2002 "Shalom On Israel", Rabin Building, Judaism Center, Hebrew University, Jerusalem.
- 2003 "Blue Mermaid", Kiryat Yam, Haifa.
- 2003 "Rush Hour", Hebrew University, Jerusalem, Israel
- 2004 "Journey into the Body" wall installation as well as seven floors with wall sculptures at the Shaha building, Rabin Medical Center, Petah Tikva, Israel
- 2004 Sculptures to the "Rabin Medical Center", Israel
- 2005 "Sun Rise" High School, Ashkelon, Israel
- 2005 "Butterflies", Mevaseret, Israel
- 2007 "Ohel Moed", Sculpture Park, kibbutz Hatzerim, negev, Israel
- 2008 "Momentum" CBD, Singapore
- 2008 "Star City", Seoul, Korea
- 2008 Six sculptures ("Sport Island"), Netanya, Israel
- 2011 Hyundai Department Store, Seoul, Korea
- 2014 Taikang Residence of Elderly People, Beijing, China
- 2014 Three Free Standing Sculptures for Athletic Stadium, Hsinchu, Taiwan
- 2014 Eleven sculptures in the Science Park in Taichung, Taiwan
- 2015 "Presence-Present", Gerstein / Alana Ruben, Jerusalem Biannale of Contemporary Jewish Art
- 2016 "Windows" – four sculptures in Modiin, Israel
- 2017 Five sculptures in National Park, Guizhou, China
- 2017 "Journey Through My Gardens", Taikang's Residence, Beijing, China
- 2020 Glass Windows, Exterior walls of Taikang Art Museum, Suzhou Park, Suzhou, China
- 2020 "Boats" Suzhou Park, Suzhou, China
- 2021 Donors Tree, Soroka Hospital, Gdolim MeHahaim building, Be'er Sheva, Israel
- 2021 "Tornado", Hsinchu, Taiwan
- 2021 Six outdoor sculptures in the Morgan Stanley building in Seoul, Korea
- 2021 "Tea for Two" in Fuliang Province, China.

== Books about Gerstein ==
- David Gerstein "Past and Present" (2012) Skira ISBN 978-88-572-1064-3
- Balconies, David Gerstein (1984) Domino Publishing House, Israel
- David Gerstein, "Works" (2010) ISBN 9659149123
- Gerstein Sculptures (2008), Adar Publications, Israel
- David Gerstein Paints The Passover Haggadah, Rabin Medical Center Publishing, 2015

== See also ==
- Visual arts in Israel
