= Uzi Arad =

Israeli foreign policy strategist and scholar

- עוזי ארד
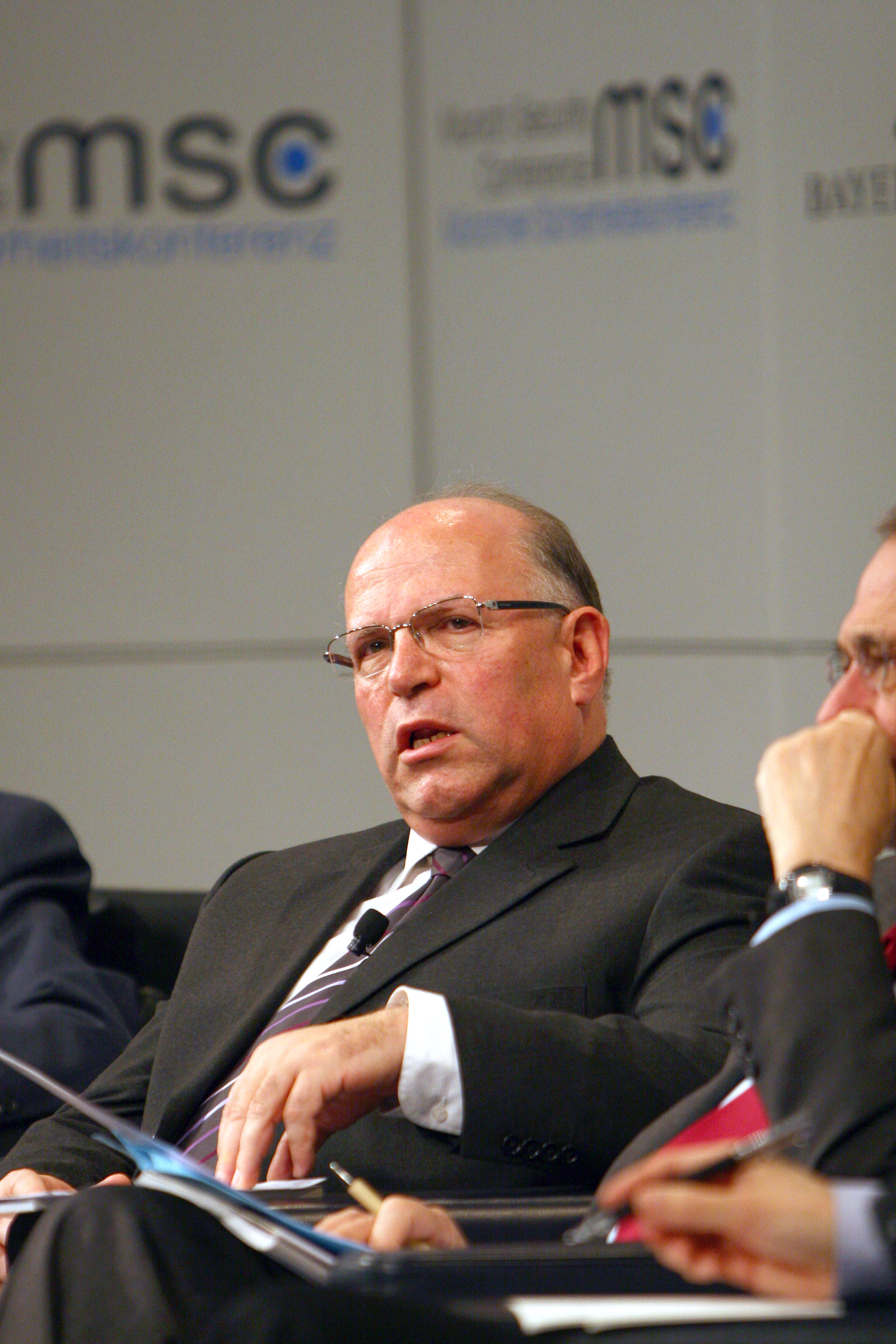
- Uzi Arad in 2011
- Born: 2 October 1947 (age 79); Tiberias, Mandatory Palestine
- Occupations: Strategist; Professor; Former National Security Advisor
- Awards: Officer of the Légion d'honneur (2013)

Academic background
- Education: Tel Aviv University (B.A.); Princeton University (M.A., Ph.D.)

Uzi Arad (Hebrew: עוזי ארד; born October 2, 1947) is an Israeli national security official and scholar.

Spending over two decades in the Mossad, Arad rose to become the agency's director of research (intelligence). Between 1997 and 1999, Arad was seconded as a foreign policy advisor to Prime Minister of Israel Benjamin Netanyahu.

Between 1999 and 2009 Arad was the founding director of the Institute for Policy and Strategy at the Herzliya Interdisciplinary Center (IDC). Arad established and chaired the annual Herzliya Conference, Israel's principal international policy conference, convening Israeli and international leaders, policy-makers and most senior experts in the field of national security, broadly defined. Arad was a professor at the Lauder School of Government, Diplomacy and Strategy. He is a fellow at the Institute for National Security Studies (INSS) in Tel Aviv. Between 2009 and 2011 Arad served as the national security advisor to the prime minister of Israel, and the head of the Israeli National Security Council. Following his NSC term, Arad was expected to be the new Israeli ambassador to London, but instead he returned to academia.

Arad had been serving as advisor to the Knesset Foreign Affairs and Defense Committee. He was also the Founding Chair of The Atlantic Forum of Israel.

Arad has been a critic of the Iraq War and former prime minister Ariel Sharon's withdrawal from the Gaza Strip, arguing that the energy spent there should have been shifted towards dealing with the nuclear program of Iran.

== Early life and education ==
Arad was born in Tiberias in 1947 to Rachel and Yaakov Bloomer, a member of the leadership of the Hashomer Hatzair movement in Romania. He was raised in Kibbutz Shamir and later in Kibbutz Zikim, before his parents left the kibbutz movement following a political split. He attended Tichon Hadash high school in Tel Aviv and accompanied his parents on diplomatic postings to France and later Mexico. While in Mexico, he studied economics and anthropology at the University of the Americas. Three years later, in 1966, Arad was drafted into the Israel Defense Forces, where he served in the Israeli Air Force as a meteorologist.

In 1971, Arad earned a bachelor's degree in history and international relations from Tel Aviv University. He was subsequently awarded a Fulbright Fellowship for advanced studies at Princeton University's Woodrow Wilson School of Public and International Affairs, where he earned an M.A. degree (1973) in public administration and international relations, and a Ph.D. degree (1975) in international relations from the Politics Department. His Ph.D. dissertation, World Energy Interdependence and the Security of Supply was supervised by Professors Richard Ullman and Edward Morse.

== Professional career ==
Arad became a Professional Staff Member with the Hudson Institute in 1972, working under Herman Kahn and Donald Brennan. At Hudson, he carried out policy work on nuclear strategy, arms control, energy and security. Arad returned to Israel in 1975 and was offered positions with the Mossad and with the Ministry of Foreign Affairs. He chose to join the Mossad, where he spent most of his professional career. He served in two divisions, one of which was the Research (Intelligence) Division, which he eventually headed (at the rank equivalent to Major General). At the Mossad, he also dealt with foreign liaison and his assignments also included posts abroad, acquiring the reputation, in the words of Andrew Marshall, the Director of the Pentagon's Office of Net Assessment, "a top global defence strategist".

Intending to retire from Mossad in 1997, Arad was elected in 1996 as director of the Jaffe Center for Strategic Studies at Tel Aviv University, now the Institute for National Security Studies. However, at the request of Prime Minister Netanyahu, Arad remained in government to serve as the prime minister's foreign policy advisor, a position he held through 1999. Concurrently with his ongoing academic activities, Arad has been advising the Knesset's Foreign Affairs and Defense Committee. He has also been active in advancing Israel's relations with Euro-Atlantic community. In 2000, Arad founded the EU-Israel Forum and led it through 2003. In 2004, he established the Atlantic Forum of Israel which seeks to enhance Israel's relations with the Atlantic Alliance.

Arad (second from right) in September 2009, seated next to Israeli prime minister Benjamin Netanyahu.

In April 2009, Arad was appointed national security advisor to the prime minister of Israel, Benjamin Netanyahu, and head of the Israeli National Security Council. While in government Arad fought for the NSC to be strengthened and upgraded, knowing it would be an uphill battle. His functional and geographical proximity to the prime minister, his personal relationship with Netanyahu, and his presence in real-time decision-making situations gave the new NSC a real role. Arad played a key role in fostering U.S.-Israel relations. In February 2011, Arad resigned his position following allegations that he had leaked classified information related to Israel–Russia relations and Israel–United States relations to a journalist. Arad denied the accusations, asserting that a senior official in the Prime Minister’s Office had fabricated the charges. In a public statement, Prime Minister Benjamin Netanyahu credited Arad with significantly elevating the functioning of the National Security Council. Arad was officially cleared by the deputy attorney general of any leak, and the comptroller general, in his report about the National Security Council sided with Arad in his approach to the implementation of the National Security Act. In 2013 the French Government awarded Arad the distinction of Officer of the Légion d'honneur.

== Academic career ==
In 1977, Arad took a sabbatical leave and carried out post-doctoral research at the Center for Strategic Studies at Tel Aviv University. Arad's co-authored volume, Sharing Global Resources, commissioned by the New York Council on Foreign Relations (with his wife, Ruth Arad and others), was published in 1979. After retiring from government in 1999, Arad lectured at Haifa University and in 2000 he joined the Interdisciplinary Center Herzliya (IDC Herzliya), which became his academic home. At IDC, he established the Institute for Policy and Strategy and founded the Annual Herzliya Conference Series on the Balance of Israel's National Security. Modeled after international policy conferences and gatherings such as the World Economic Forum (Davos), the Munich Conference on Security Policy (Munich), the Trilateral Commission meetings, and the International Institute for Strategic Studies (IISS) conferences, the Herzliya Conference soon became the principal policy event in Israel.

In 2005, the Israeli Council on Higher Education conferred upon Arad the academic rank of Professor in recognition of his expertise and international reputation. In the course of his work at IDC Herzliya, Arad conceived of a path-breaking international policy project exploring the applications of risk management to national and international security policy. Involving a global group of scholars and coordinated at Yale University and the Eurasia Group, the project culminated in the book Managing Strategic Surprise: Lessons from Risk Management and Risk Assessment. Arad contributed a chapter on intelligence and surprise attack, in which he applied analytical tools of risk management to the integrative administration of national intelligence systems. The edited volume garnered academic and professional acclaim and has been portrayed as a "superb collection of our best thought leaders." In 2013 Arad initiated, with the Technion’s Samuel Neaman Institute, the Israel’s Grand-Strategy forum which he chaired. The forum submitted its conclusions and recommendations to the president of the State of Israel in 2017.

== Public activities ==
Arad held several public duties while out of his governmental positions:

- 2005–2009: Board member, The Israeli Society for Excellence through Education;
- 2011–2013: Chair, Center for Defence Studies;
- 2007– : Board member, Center for Intelligence Heritage (Malam);
- 2013– : Board member, Yad David Ben Gurion Society;

== Selected publications ==
- Sharing Global Resources. McGraw Hill for the Council on Foreign Relations, New York. 1979. ISBN 978-0-07-002151-8. (with R. McCullock, R.W. Arad, J. Pinera, and A.L. Hollick)
- The Balance of Israel's National Security. Yediot Ahronot Publishing House, Tel Aviv - Hebrew. 2001.
- The NSC - The Struggle to Create and Transform the National Security Council (With Limor Ben Har). Dvir Pub., Tel Aviv. 2016 - Hebrew
- A Grand Strategy for Israel - Reflections and Directions (With Dror Strum and Zeev Tadmor). Samuel Neaman Institute, The Technion, Haifa, 2017- Hebrew
