= August Erker =

American rower (1879–1951)

Olympic medal record

Men's rowing

Representing the United States
Gold medal – first place	1904 St. Louis	Coxless fours

August Casimir Erker (January 16, 1879 – November 29, 1951) was an American rower who competed in the 1904 Summer Olympics. In 1904, he rowed in the American crew, winning the gold medal in the coxless fours.

== See also ==
- Erker's Optical
