= Costa Del Mar =

American sunglasses manufacturer

- Type: Division
- Industry: Sunglasses
- Founded: 1983
- Founder: Ray Ferguson co. Owner Austin Leplow
- Headquarters: Daytona Beach, Florida, United States
- Key people: John Costa (CEO)
- Products: Sunglasses, Eyewear, Apparel
- Revenue: $100 million (2013)
- Parent: EssilorLuxottica
- Website: www.costadelmar.com/en-us

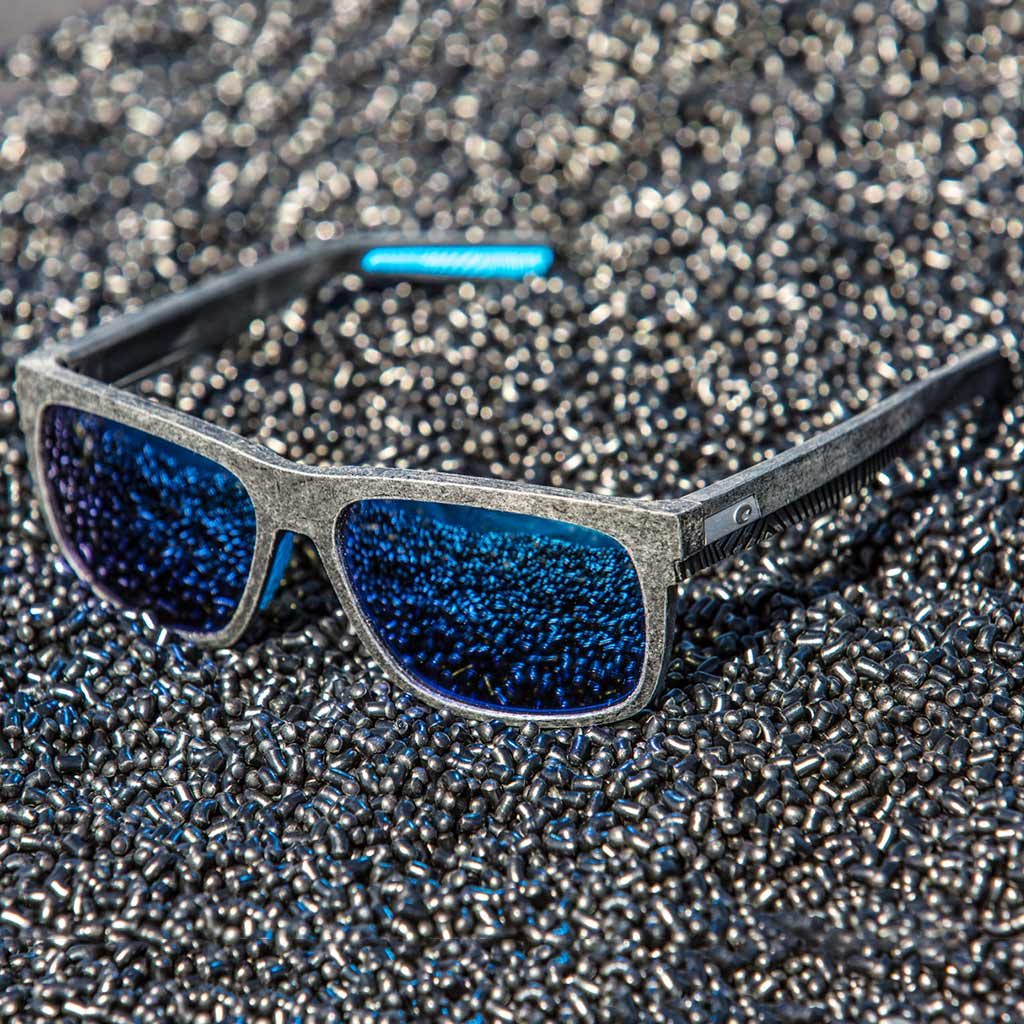
Costa Del Mar's Caldera Sunglasses from the Untangled Collection. These are made from plastic pellets processed from recycled fishing nets.

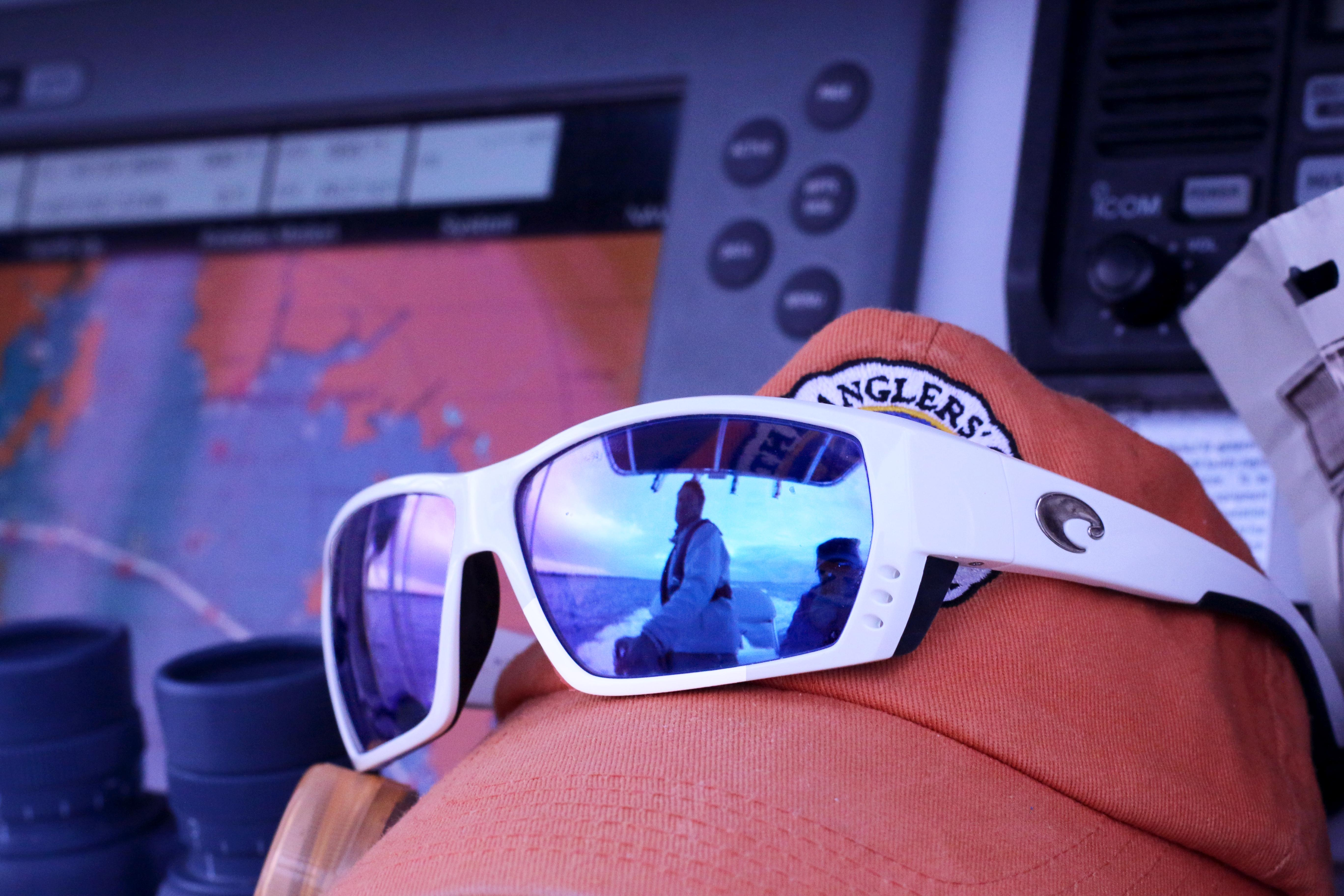
Costa Del Mar sunglasses.

Costa Del Mar or simply Costa is a manufacturer of polarized sunglasses based in Daytona Beach. Luxottica closed the facility when they purchased the brand. It is a wholly owned subsidiary of EssilorLuxottica. Their sunglasses are popular in the sport sunglasses market, and are considered good for outdoor sports practicing, such as Summer activities, recreational fishing and boating. Costa's Baffin Sunglasses won Best of Show: Eyewear at ICAST 2018.

"Costa Del Mar" is Spanish for "coast of the sea". The company was acquired by Essilor in 2013, which itself merged with Luxottica to form EssilorLuxottica in 2018; Costa was placed under the control of the Luxottica division.

== History ==
Costa Del Mar was founded in 1983 by Ray Ferguson in Daytona Beach. By 1986, it was the official gear of the Stars & Stripes team in America's Cup yacht racing contest and quickly became popular among surfers and recreational fishermen due to its sun glare protection. The brand made an appearance in the 1987 video game California Games as one of the sponsors.

The brand was acquired by Essilor in 2013 for approximately $270 million in an all-cash deal.

In 2017, Costa partnered with NASCAR driver Austin Dillon to create a limited quantity of special edition sunglasses. Dillon won the 2018 Daytona 500.

In August 2017, a new vice-president of marketing by the name of TJ McMeniman was nominated.

The company was involved in a series of lawsuits for "deceptive trade practices". These lawsuits were based on the warranty, which claimed that glasses would either be replaced or repaired for "a nominal fee". The class action lawsuit alleged that the "nominal fee" was just shy of the actual price of a new pair of glasses.

In August 2019 the CEO, Holly Rush, was let go and all department heads report directly to Luxottica. In December 2019, it was announced that operations in Daytona Beach would cease by February 7, 2020, and the rest of the layoffs would be complete by September 2020. Most of the production of sunglasses will be manufactured at Luxottica's factory in Foothill Ranch, California.

== Social responsibility ==
Costa has a charity campaign called #OneCoast that helps victims of natural disasters by raising funds for the Red Cross hurricane relief program.

They also have a campaign called Costa+OCEARCH, as a result with a partnership with OCEARCH, also intended to raise funds to the non-governmental organization dedicated to protect ocean wildlife.

In 2018, Costa launched their Untangled Collection. This collection is a partnership with Bureo to reduce plastic waste from fishing nets in the ocean. Bureo collects the fishing nets and turns them into plastic pellets, which Costa uses to create these frames.

== Product innovation ==
Costa is widely recognized for its proprietary 580 lens technology, which enhances color and contrast by filtering out harsh yellow light and harmful blue light. These lenses are available in both 580G (glass) and 580P (polycarbonate) formats, offering superior clarity, scratch resistance, and lightweight comfort. All Costa sunglasses are polarized, providing 100% UV protection and reducing glare from reflective surfaces like water, making them especially popular as fishing sunglasses among both recreational and professional anglers.

In addition to its lens technology, Costa has introduced frame innovations such as sweat management channels, adjustable nose pads, and improved grip in its PRO Series, designed for high-performance use in marine environments.

== Recent developments ==
As of 2023, Costa continues to operate under EssilorLuxottica, with a renewed focus on performance eyewear for water-based activities. The brand has expanded its PRO Series line, which includes rugged frames and advanced lens technology tailored for professional anglers and outdoor enthusiasts.

Costa has also strengthened its sustainability initiatives, continuing its Untangled Collection and expanding programs like Kick Plastic and Responsible Shipping, which encourage eco-conscious consumer behavior and logistics.
