= EssilorLuxottica =

Franco-Italian multinational corporation

EssilorLuxottica S.A.
- Type: Public
- Traded as: Euronext Paris: EL; CAC 40 component; Euro Stoxx 50 component
- ISIN: FR0000121667
- Industry: Eyewear; Eye care
- Predecessors: Essilor; Luxottica
- Founded: 1 October 2018; 8 years ago
- Headquarters: Paris, France, and Milan, Italy
- Number of locations: 17,750 stores (2025)
- Key people: Francesco Milleri (chairman and CEO)
- Products: Ophthalmic lenses, optical equipment, prescription glasses and sunglasses
- Brands: Crizal; LensCrafters; Oakley; Oliver Peoples; Persol; Ray-Ban; Sunglass Hut; Supreme; Transitions Optical; Varilux; Alook Eyewear
- Revenue: ▲€28.491 billion (2025)
- Operating income: ▼€3.379 billion (2025)
- Net income: ▼€2.443 billion (2025)
- Total assets: ▼€63.895 billion (2025)
- Total equity: ▼€39.493 billion (2025)
- Owner: Delfin S.à.r.l (32.42% of shares, 31.45% of votes); Internal shareholders (4.43% of shares, 4.49% of votes); Public float (63.13% of shares, 64.06% of votes)
- Number of employees: 203,791 (2025)
- Subsidiaries: Essilor; Luxottica
- Website: essilorluxottica.com

EssilorLuxottica's former logo used from 2018 to 2022

EssilorLuxottica SA is a Franco-Italian vertically integrated multinational holding company registered in Charenton-Le-Pont and headquartered both in Paris and Milan. It designs, produces and markets ophthalmic lenses, equipment and instruments, prescription glasses and sunglasses. It was founded on 1 October 2018, and its name is an amalgamation of the two major corporations which merged to create it; the French Essilor and the Italian Luxottica. The two companies have, since the merger, been restructured as subsidiaries of the new entity.

Under the terms of the merger agreement, Essilor would purchase Luxottica, but Luxottica's leadership would be guaranteed prominent positions in the newly-formed corporation as well as some seats on its board of directors; the Luxottica founder, Leonardo Del Vecchio, was notably designated chairman. The first few years of EssilorLuxottica post-merger were marred by disputes over leadership roles, but Del Vecchio was able to bring them to a satisfactory end.

Essilor and Luxottica were respectively the world's leading manufacturers of ophthalmic lenses and of eyeglasses; upon the merger, EssilorLuxottica thus became a monopoly.

Essilor contributed its numerous proprietary lens technologies as well as its subsidiaries to the new company. Meanwhile, the latter gained through Luxottica ownership of numerous eyewear brands including Ray-Ban, Oakley, Persol, Oliver Peoples, and Vogue Eyewear; the eyewear retailers LensCrafters, Pearle Vision, and Sunglass Hut, the eyewear insurance company EyeMed, and exclusive eyewear licensing deals with numerous fashion houses. The company is listed on the Euronext Paris stock exchange under the trading symbol "EL" and is part of the CAC 40 share index, which includes the 40 largest capitalized companies traded on the Paris Stock Exchange, and the Euro Stoxx 50, which includes the 50 largest companies in the Eurozone. In 2025, the company generated €28.491 billion in revenue.

== History ==
=== Merger of Essilor and Luxottica ===
In January 2017, Essilor and Luxottica announced the merger of their activities. After having received the necessary authorizations from the competition authorities of the United States, the European Union, Brazil, Canada and China, EssilorLuxottica was created on 1 October 2018. On a technical level, Essilor acquired Luxottica, though Luxottica founder and executive chairman Leonardo Del Vecchio became co-leader of the new conglomerate, which would change its name to contain both companies. Luxottica proceeded to delist its American depositary receipts from the New York Stock Exchange upon announcement of the merger.

Del Vecchio's holding company, Delfin, then held 62.42% of Luxottica, a share that it contributed to EssilorLuxotica. Delfin also became a plurality shareholder of the new group with 38.9% of the capital.

This merger gives birth to a giant of the optical industry, generating a turnover of more than €16 billion and a market capitalization of €57 billion. The merger did not occur without controversy from anti-trust researchers, however, and Turkish authorities, accusing the company of not fulfilling anti-trust obligations it had agreed to during the merger, fined EssilorLuxottica €17 million in late August 2023.

=== Internal war for leadership ===
Despite the merger being completed in 2018, the company still faced an internal leadership battle for control of the company, fought between old Essilor leadership and Del Vecchio, who went on to state in a March 2019 interview with Le Figaro that Essilor CEO Hubert Sagnières "only listened to himself", and had cost the company up to €600 million in savings from the merger. Sagnières responded to Del Vecchio by accusing the Luxottica founder of attempting to take control of the newly formed conglomerate without offering "a premium to shareholders" of EssilorLuxottica. Del Vecchio further accused Sagnières of inexperience when running an eyewear company. The terms of the merger provided that old Essilor leadership as well as Luxottica's officers would have equal control over the merged entity, though the company would select a new CEO, internally or externally, by the end of 2020.

Ultimately, Del Vecchio won with the backing of EssilorLuxottica shareholders. Del Vecchio chose to appoint Francesco Milleri as CEO and Paul du Saillant as deputy CEO. Saginères ultimately departed EssilorLuxottica after the feud, and Del Vecchio, who previously agreed to limit his voting rights to control the company, regained the full weight of such voting rights. A company statement to the Financial Times reflected the settled nature of the conflict, stating that the resolution of the leadership battle represented "the victory of a vision, the creation of an extraordinary business that is at the beginning of what it can achieve". Del Vecchio further reflected the new company's leadership by going on to state that his "life-long dream" of creating a dominant vertically integrated company in eyewear has "finally come true".

=== Later acquisitions ===
At the beginning of 2019, EssilorLuxottica acquired German-based Brille24 GmbH. Essilor's partner Shamir acquired Union Optic, a prescription laboratory that also distributes optical instruments. Essilor also acquired a majority stake in Indulentes, one of Ecuador's leading prescription laboratories, and a majority stake in Metalizado Optico Argentino S.A. (MOA), one of Argentina's leading prescription laboratories.

EssilorLuxottica acquired a 75% stake in the Dutch opticians group GrandVision, which owns Vision Express in the UK and For Eyes in the US, in 2019 for €28 per share, which would value the entirety of GrandVision at Euro 7.2 billion.

Del Vecchio died in June 2022, leaving $350 million in shares to Milleri.

In August 2022, Essilor bought the remaining 50 percent stake in Shamir Optical Industry. Additionally, the company announced it would acquire Israeli startup Nuance Hearing for an undisclosed amount. This was the first major strategy shift and industry expansion for the company after Del Vecchio's 2022 death, and it accompanied reports that the firm was planning to introduce hearing aid technology into its lenses.

In July 2024, EssilorLuxottica agreed to buy US streetwear brand Supreme for US$1.5 billion, expanding its brand portfolio beyond eyewear and lenses for the first time. The acquisition was completed on 2 October 2024. Days later, it was reported that Meta was in talks to purchase a 5% stake in EssilorLuxottica. In September 2024 the two companies extended into the next decade their smart-glasses partnership, which began with the Ray-Ban Stories in 2021.

In July 2024, EssilorLuxottica acquired an 80% shareholding in Heidelberg Engineering. The Germany-headquartered Heidelberg specializes in ophthalmic diagnostic instruments based around optical coherence tomography (OCT), confocal microscopy, and scanning lasers.

=== 2021 data breach ===
May 2023 saw EssilorLuxottica confirm that it had suffered a data breach two years earlier in 2021; upon noticing the breach, the company immediately alerted the FBI and Italian law enforcement. A spokesperson for the company stated that the company was first aware of the data breach in November 2022, and the owner of the website Have I Been Pwned? stated that around 77 million accounts were released.

== Operations ==
The company dominates the global eyewear market as the largest single player in that market.

=== Retail ===
EssilorLuxottica is the largest company in retail sales, owning many of the largest eyewear retail chains in the world. By number of locations, EssilorLuxottica's largest store chain is Sunglass Hut, with 3,131 locations as of 2025. Its second largest and third largest chains are Óticas Carol with 1,425 locations and LensCrafters with 1,098 locations. Online, the company further owns Clearly, Eyebuydirect, FramesDirect.com, and online properties under its brand names such as Ray-Ban and Oakley.

EssilorLuxottica retail brands by number of locations in 2025
Brand name	Number of locations
Sunglass Hut	3,131
Óticas Carol	1,425
LensCrafters	1,098
Vision Express	983
Apollo	888
Pearle	713
Générale d’Optique	668
Target Optical	591
Pearle Vision	549
MasVisión	508
Mujosh	464
OPSM	397
Bolon	382
Oakley	375
GrandVision	368
GrandOptical	364
Atasun Optik	348
GMO	343
Ray-Ban	282
Salmoiraghi & Viganò	269
Synoptik	247
Luxoptica	239
MultiÓpticas	212
Supreme	18
All Others	2,888

=== Eyewear brands ===
The company, inherited mostly from the Luxottica side, has control over some of the most recognized brands in eyewear. Previous acquisitions from Luxottica include Vogue Eyewear in 1990, Persol in 1995, Ray-Ban and Arnette in 1999, Oakley and Oliver Peoples in 2007, Alain Mikli in 2012, and Bolon eyewear owner Xiamen Yarui Optical in 2013. Essilor also brought some eyewear brands to the combined company, the largest of which being Foster Grant, acquired in 2010, and Costa Del Mar, a part of Essilor since 2014.

Despite ownership of brands, Luxottica also brought over exclusive eyewear manufacturing deals to the company, mostly with major European fashion houses. Armani was Luxottica's first major licensing deal in 1989, one that remains intact to this day, and the company additionally manufactures eyewear for many companies, including but not limited to brands owned by Tapestry, Capri Holdings, Ralph Lauren Corporation, and Ferrari.

In addition to the brands it owns, EssilorLuxottica presently has exclusive manufacturing licensing for Armani, Brooks Brothers, Burberry, Chanel, Coach, Dolce & Gabbana, Ferrari (through a Ray-Ban partnership), Michael Kors' eyewear, Miu Miu, Prada, Ralph Lauren, Swarovski, Tiffany & Co., Tory Burch, and Versace. EssilorLuxottica also signed new licensing deals with Jimmy Choo and Kodak in 2023, though did not renew its license with LVMH-owned Bulgari, which expired at the end of 2023.

=== Lens technologies ===
According to its website, it owns the following lens technologies:

- Crizal
- Essilor
- Essilor Sun Solution
- Eyezen
- Kodak
- Oakley
- Optifog
- Ray-Ban
- Transitions
- Varilux
- Xperio
- Shamir
