= Vision Express =

British eyewear company owned by EssilorLuxottica

Coordinates: 52°53′03″N 1°08′36″W

Vision Express (UK) Limited
- Type: Private Limited Company
- Industry: Optometrists and dispensing opticians
- Founded: 1988; 38 years ago
- Founder: Dean Butler
- Headquarters: Ruddington, England, UK, Nottingham, Nottinghamshire
- Number of locations: 549
- Area served: United Kingdom; Republic of Ireland; Jersey
- Key people: Steve Worboys (MD)
- Products: Spectacles, Contact lenses, Sunglasses, Eye Examinations
- Services: Eye Exams, Contact Lens Assessments, Spectacles Dispensing
- Revenue: ▲£280m (2012)
- Operating income: ▲£16.4m (2012)
- Owner: EssilorLuxottica
- Number of employees: 5250 apx (inc. joint venture partnerships)
- Parent: Vision Express Group Ltd
- Subsidiaries: Abbeyfield V.E. Ltd; Vision Express (CLS) Ltd
- Website: www.visionexpress.com

Vision Express is a British eyewear company established in 1988. It operates a chain of opticians in the United Kingdom and Republic of Ireland, providing eye examinations and selling spectacles, sunglasses and contact lenses. The company was founded in 1988 and is headquartered in Ruddington, Nottinghamshire. It is a subsidiary of EssilorLuxottica.

== History ==
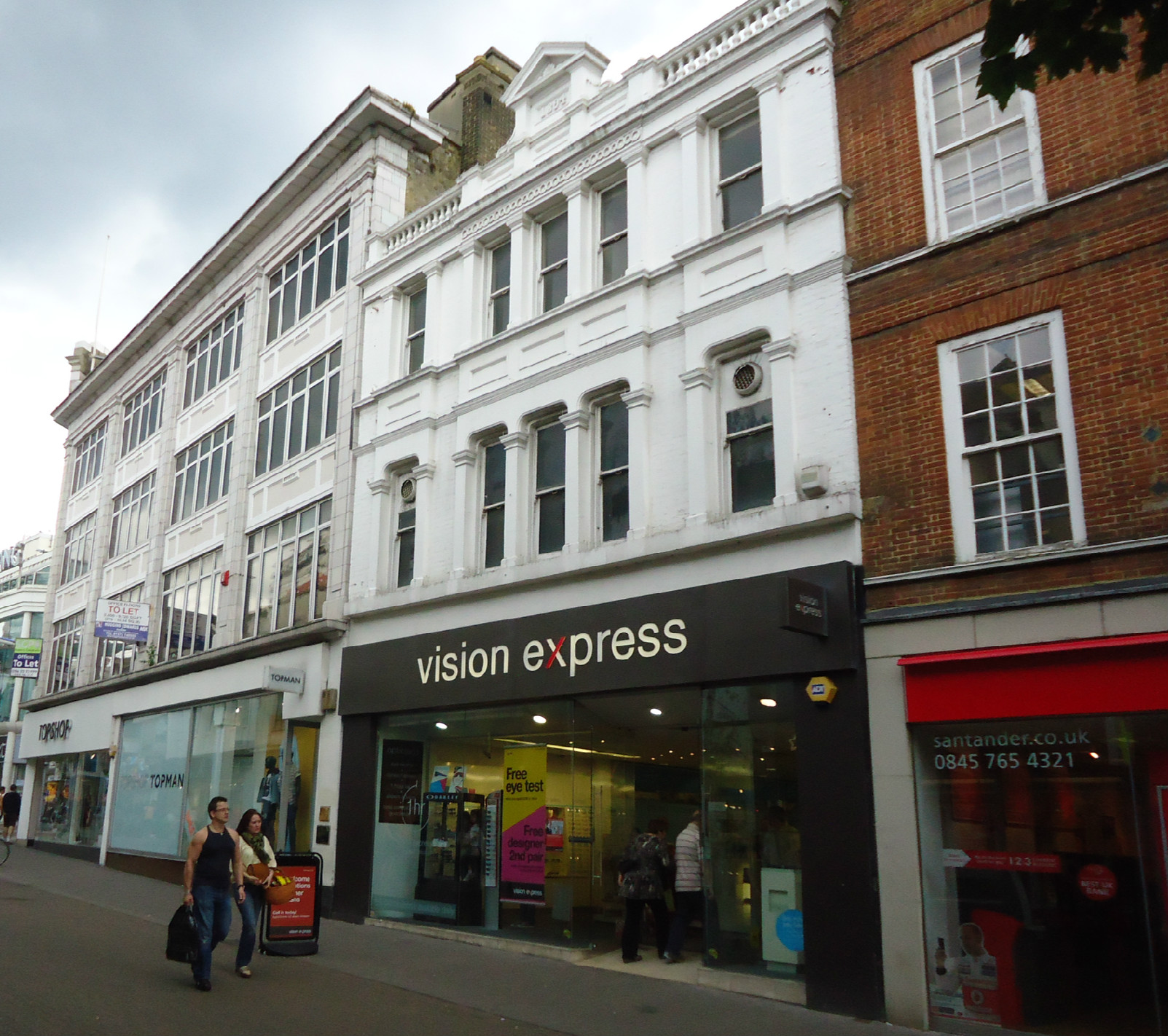
The Sutton, London branch

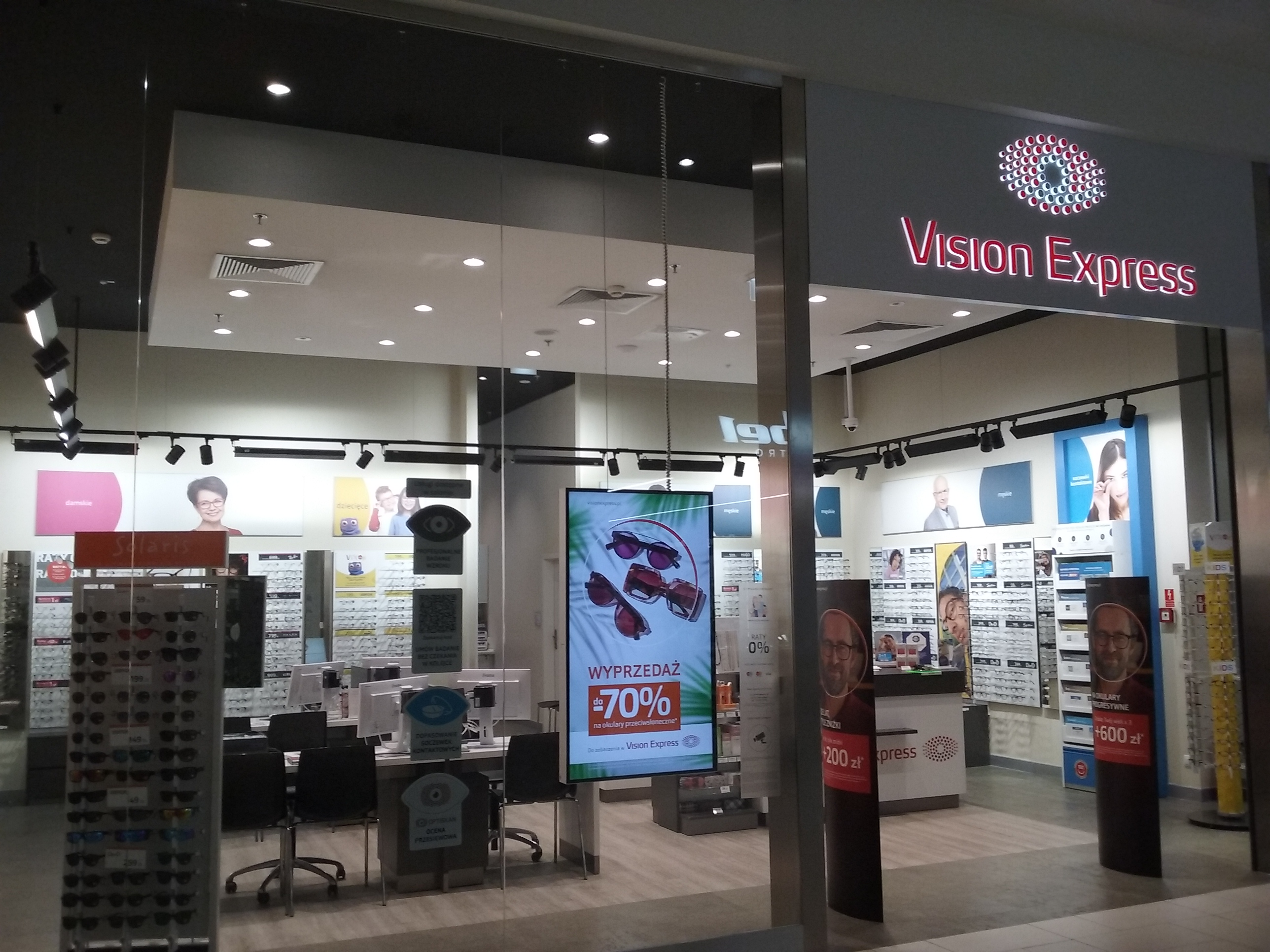
Vision Express optical shop in Tomaszów Mazowiecki, Poland

The company opened its first practice in 1988 by American entrepreneur Dean Butler. Its first location was at the MetroCentre, Gateshead, followed by other stores.

The company developed a high-volume optical retail model influenced by the "one-hour" service concept used in other parts of the optical industry.

In October 1993, Vision Express acquired seven LensCrafters locations from US Shoe Corp Cincinnati. Two years later, in 1995, the first store operating on a joint venture basis was opened..

=== Grandvision ===
Grand Vision acquired Vision Express in 1997. The French parent company Grand Vision has clinics under various brands across Europe, and the rest of the world. Under franchise agreement there is a strong Vision Express brand present also in Latvian and Lithuanian markets. These clinics were acquired from GrandVision by Latvian entrepreneurs of "LU Optometrijas Centrs SIA". Currently "Vision Express" brand in Latvia and Lithuania is operated as a part of OC VISION group.

=== Expansion and acquisitions ===
By 2007, Vision Express operated more than 220 practices in the United Kingdom.

In May 2008, Vision Express acquired Batemans Opticians. The acquisition included around 75 stores in Southern England. The majority of these practices have since been rebranded as Vision Express.

On 1 May 2013, Vision Express announced that it had acquired 12 optical clinics from Crown Eyeglass Ltd.

In February 2014, Vision Express acquired Rayner & Keeler Opticians. Later that year, it also acquired the business of Liverpool-based Conlons Opticians. The Conlons transaction involved 19 clinics, with some continuing to operate from their existing premises and others transferring services to nearby Vision Express locations.

Three years later, in December 2017, Vision Express announced the completion of the deal to incorporate 209 Tesco Opticians into the portfolio. This increased the Vision Express store count (in the UK) to 600. By June 2018, all the Tesco Optician clinics had been rebranded to VE@Tesco.

== Operations ==
There are currently 575 clinics throughout the United Kingdom, Jersey and the Republic of Ireland. Of these clinics approx. 195 are fully company-owned, with the remainder being under joint Venture partnerships.

Vision Express also operates more than 110 clinics in Poland. It opened a series of clinics in India in partnership with Reliance. In 2025, there were 105 Vision Express stores across India.

=== COVID-19 operations ===
In late March 2020, Vision Express closed non-essential branches indefinitely in a nationwide response to the COVID-19 pandemic. Onur Köksal, (CEO) began to initiate the furlough of all non-essential staff. A small number of clinics are said to have remained open to offer essential, emergency clinical care.

== See also ==
- EssilorLuxottica
- Optometry
- LensCrafters
- Specsavers
