= Transitions Optical =

American photochromic lens manufacturer

Transitions Optical, Inc.
- Type: Subsidiary
- Industry: Optical; Eyewear, eyeglass, Lenses
- Founded: 1990
- Headquarters: Pinellas Park, Florida, United States
- Area served: Worldwide
- Key people: Chrystel Barranger (President of Photochromics)
- Products: Photochromic lenses
- Number of employees: 320
- Parent: EssilorLuxottica
- Website: www.transitions.com

Transitions Optical is a U.S.-based company known for manufacturing photochromic lenses, which darken on exposure to specific types of light. The company was founded in 1990 as a joint venture between PPG Industries (51%) and Essilor (49%). In April 2014, Essilor acquired PPG's entire stake in Transitions, making it a wholly-owned subsidiary. After Essilor's merger with Luxottica, it became a subsidiary of the combined EssilorLuxottica.

From 2009 to 2012, Transitions Optical was the title sponsor of the Transitions Championship, a PGA Tour event held at Innisbrook Resort and Golf Club in Palm Harbor, Florida. The firm was the Official Eyewear of the PGA Tour, Champions Tour and Nationwide Tour. It also sponsors pro cycling Team Garmin-Cervelo.
