= Shamir Optical Industry =

Israeli optical lens company

Shamir Optical Industry Ltd
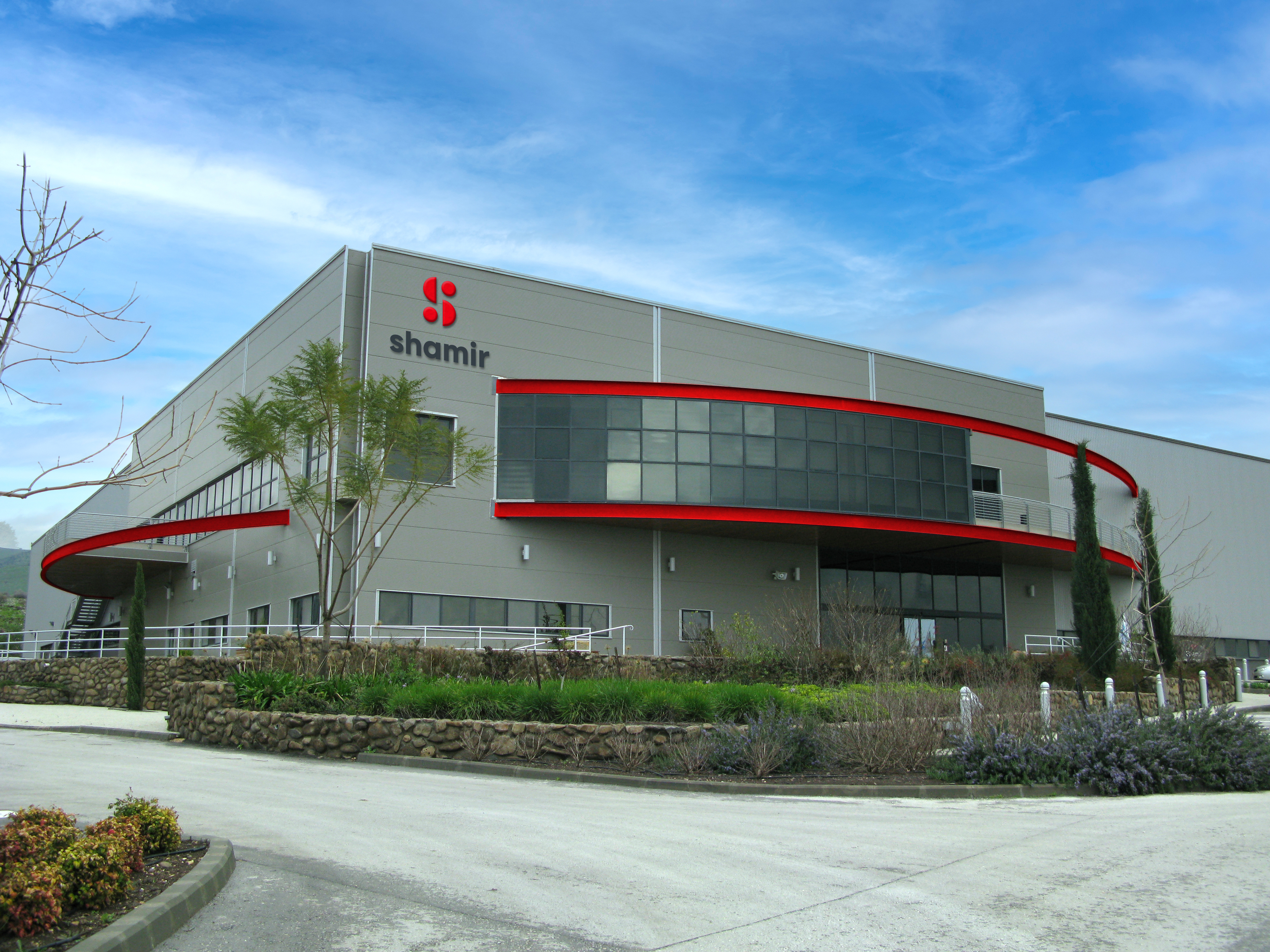
- Native name: שמיר תעשיית אופטיקה בע"מ
- Company type: Jointly owned private company
- Traded as: Nasdaq: SHMR (until 2011)
- Industry: Optics
- Founded: 1972; 54 years ago, at Kibbutz Shamir, Israel
- Headquarters: Kibbutz Shamir, Israel, Israel
- Number of locations: 18 Optical Labs and companies (2020)
- Area served: Worldwide
- Services: Development, production and marketing of progressive optical lenses
- Owner: Essilor
- Number of employees: 2,200 employees work in Israel and abroad in 23 subsidiaries - 19 of which are production sites (2021)
- Parent: Essilor
- Website: https://shamir.com

Shamir Optical Industry Ltd. is an international company headquartered in Kibbutz Shamir, Israel that develops and manufactures optical lenses for eyeglasses. In 2005, the company issued dual listings, on the Tel Aviv Stock Exchange and NASDAQ, becoming the first kibbutz company to be listed on NASDAQ.

== History ==
The Shamir optics factory was established in Kibbutz Shamir in 1972 to meet the need of kibbutz members for non-agricultural work. To this end, the kibbutz signed an agreement with the American company "KMS Industries" (owned by Kip Siegel), to establish a bi-focal lens factory in Israel, with production intended entirely for export.

As part of the agreement, the company, which produced optics for televisions, agreed to provide know-how to the factory and even to buy all its products for the first two years. In 1972, about two years after signing the agreement, Shamir Optical Industry Ltd was established, and the kibbutz optics factory for the production of bi-focal lenses was inaugurated by Pinchas Sapir, Israel Minister of Trade and Industry.

The company expanded its production and started manufacturing progressive lenses in addition to its existing line of lenses in 1984. During that year, the factory's turnover was half a million dollars, and about 20% of the country's optics industry sector originated in the Kibbutz Shamir factory.

In 1990, the company gained a foothold in the United States, with the establishment of its subsidiary, Shamir USA. Eleven years later, Shamir set up a distribution center to supply semi-finished lenses to laboratories across the United States, and for that purpose it set up another company called Shamir Insight Inc.

In 2005, Shamir Optics became a public company, issued on both the Tel Aviv Stock Exchange and NASDAQ at a value of $225.4 million, making it the first kibbutz company to be issued on NASDAQ, and was the only company which has been listed on the American stock exchange that develops multifocal lenses.

In 2008, Shamir strengthened its position in Europe by making the German distribution company, Altra Trading, a wholly owned subsidiary following the acquisition of 49% of its shares, adding to the 51% already held.

The company merged with the French optics company Essilor in 2011. The merger was carried out through the purchase of 37% of shares from the public and another 13% of shares from Shamir Optical Industry Ltd., totaling 50% of the company, for $130 million. Upon completion of the merger with Essilor, Shamir was delisted from NASDAQ and became a private company.

In 2011, Dymotech Ltd filed a $28 million lawsuit against Shamir and its partly owned subsidiary Inray Ltd. Dymotech Ltd. alleged that Shamir and Inray were illegally used Technion's intellectual property, and requested restraining order against them to prevent future use of its alleged intellectual property.

In May 2021, Shamir completed acquisition of Lenstec Optical Group on behalf of its owner Essilor.

In August 2022, EssilorLuxottica completed acquisition of 100% Shamir.
