= Shamir, Israel =

Shamir: שמיר (Hebrew)
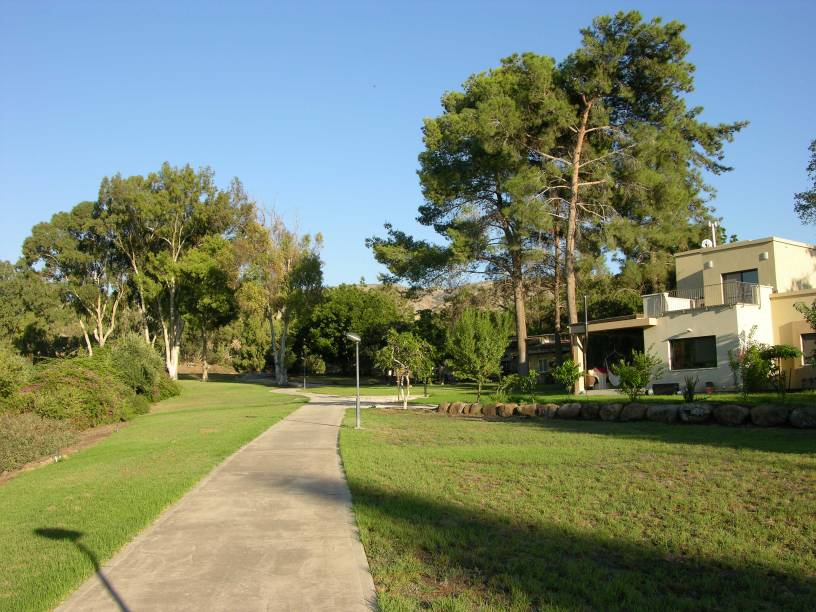

- Location within Northeast Israel
- Coordinates: 33°9′55″N 35°39′39″E
- Country: Israel
- District: Northern
- Subdistrict: Safed
- Council: Upper Galilee
- Affiliation: Kibbutz Movement
- Founded: 1944
- Founder: Romanian Hashomer; Hatzair members
- Population (2024): 825
- Website: www.shamir.org.il

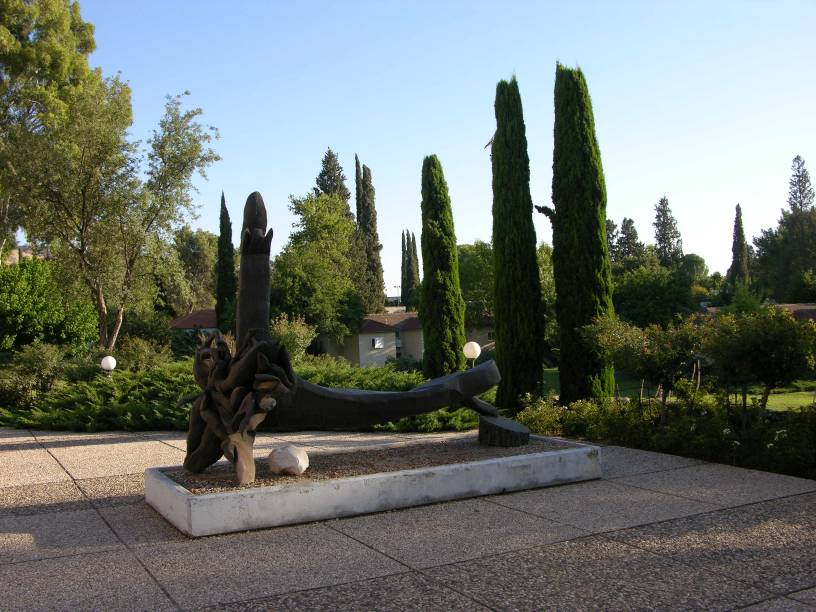
Memorial for Edna, Shoshana and Judi who were killed in 1974

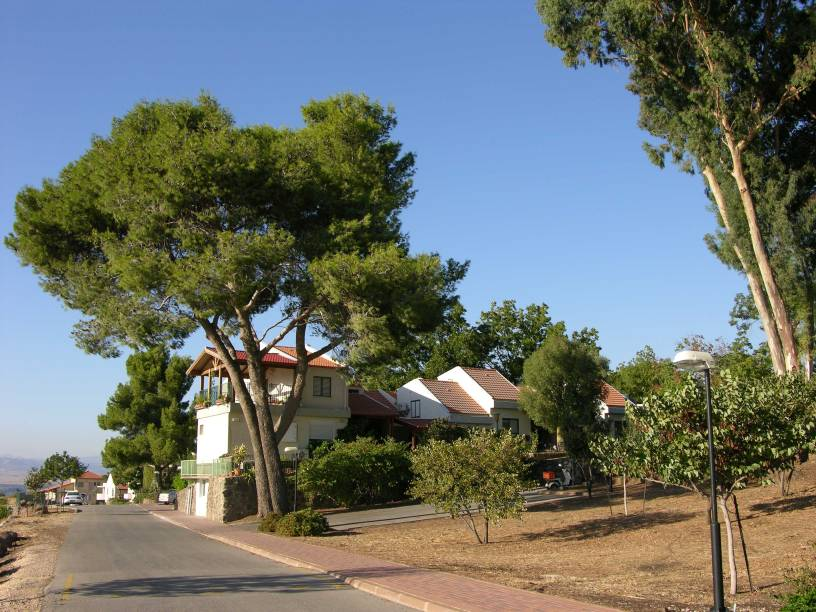
Homes on kibbutz Shamir

Shamir (Hebrew: שמיר) is a kibbutz in Upper Galilee area of Israel. Located on the western slopes of the Golan Heights, it falls under the jurisdiction of Upper Galilee Regional Council. In 2024 it had a population of 825.

== History ==
=== Archaeology ===
Surrounding the kibbutz is a field of more than 400 dolmens, dated to the Bronze Age IB (c. 2350–2000 BCE). The largest of the dolmens has a basalt capstone of 50 tons which has rare rock art on its underside. Its excavators judge that the scale of the dolmen field and size of the dolmens indicate a governmental system more complex than that usually assigned to the period.

Of notable interest are 3rd/4th-century Dioclateanic boundary stones with Greek inscriptions. The stones name the village of Migēramē (Greek: Μιγηραμη), identified at the site of al-Muqārināt, northeast of Kfar Szold, in the Golan Heights.

=== Modern history ===
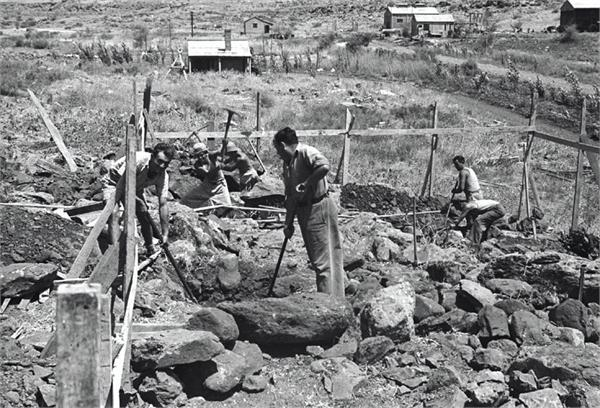
The first houses in Shamir, 1947

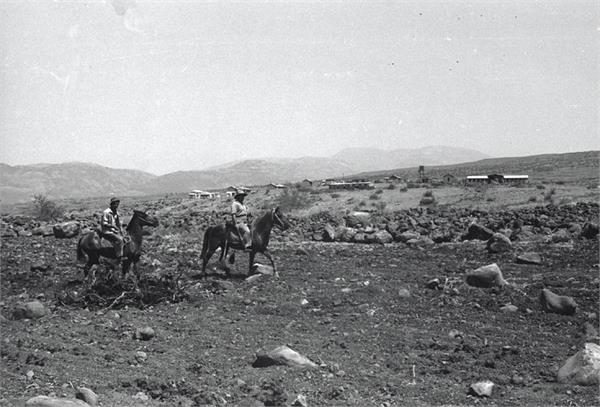
Shamir, 1947

The kibbutz was established in 1944 by a small group of mainly Romanian immigrants. The first-generation settlers were members of the socialist Zionist youth movement Hashomer Hatzair. Following the 1948 Arab–Israeli War the United Nations-established border between Israel and Syria was drawn to run only a few hundred yards east of the kibbutz.

On Thursday 13 June 1974, four PFLP-GC militants infiltrated the Lebanon-Israel border and invaded the kibbutz with the aim of capturing hostages for a prisoner swap. They entered one of the buildings shooting a pregnant woman Edna Mor (28) and another woman Shoshana Galili (58). Edna left behind a child and husband. They continued shooting at random. Judith Sinton (19), a Kibbutz volunteer from New Zealand, on her way back to the apiary after breakfast, was shot and killed by one of the terrorists. The members of the kibbutz seized their weapons and ran in the direction from where gunfire was heard. In the gun battle that followed, all four militants were killed. Their written message ends: "We love to die, as you love to live." The artist Avraham Eilat who was at that time a member of the kibbutz documented the event.

== Economy ==
As of 2006, Shamir was one of the most prosperous kibbutzim in Israel, producing honey, toiletries, and advanced optical products. The optical enterprise, Shamir Optical Industry, was previously a fully incorporated stock company, quoted on NASDAQ. In 2011 Essilor became a 50% shareholder and the company went private.

The kibbutz also earns money from tourism; it offers views of Mount Hermon to the north and the Hula Valley below the kibbutz. A relatively rare phenomenon can be observed from Shamir—a "sunrise in the west." As the kibbutz is nested in the steeply-rising western slopes of the Golan, when the sun rises, its first rays at daybreak illuminate the peaks of the Ramim mountain range across the valley to the west of Shamir. As the sun climbs progressively higher, more of Ramim is bathed in sunshine, which can then be observed progressing from west to east, down the slopes of Ramim, across the valley and up the slopes of the Golan before reaching the kibbutz.

== Notable people ==
- Sara Braverman
- Uzi Arad
