= Xiamen Yarui Optical =

Chinese eyewear company

Xiamen Yarui Optical Co., Ltd
- Type: Private
- Industry: Medical equipment
- Founded: 2004; 22 years ago
- Headquarters: Xiamen, China

Chinese name
- Simplified Chinese: 厦门雅瑞光学有限公司
Transcriptions
Standard Mandarin
- Hanyu Pinyin: Xiàmén Yǎruì Guāngxué Yǒuxiàn Gōngsī
- Website: bolon.com

Xiamen Yarui Optical Co., Ltd (Chinese: 厦门雅瑞光学有限公司; pinyin: Xiàmén Yǎruì Guāngxué Yǒuxiàn Gōngsī), doing business as Bolon (Chinese: 暴龙; pinyin: Bàolóng) and Molsion, is a Chinese eyewear manufacturer. The company is headquartered in Xiamen.

Xiamen Yarui Optical is one of the world's largest eyeglasses manufacturers, and Bolon is China's largest eyewear brand. The company has expanded beyond its core market of China to Singapore and other markets in Asia and Europe. In 2013, Essilor acquired a 50% stake in Xiamen Yarui Optical.

== See also ==
- EssilorLuxottica
