= FramesDirect.com =

International online eyewear retailer owned by EssilorLuxottica

Frames Direct
- Company type: Private company
- Founded: 1996; 30 years ago
- Headquarters: Lewisville, Texas, {{{location_country}}}
- Area served: Worldwide
- Creators: Dhavid Cooper, OD; Guy Hodgson, OD
- Industry: Eye care, E-commerce
- Products: Eyeglasses, sunglasses, prescription sunglasses, contact lenses
- Services: Online eyewear retail and delivery
- Parent: EssilorLuxottica
- Divisions: Armed Forces Eyewear (AFEyewear Members)
- Website: www.framesdirect.com
- Current status: Active

Frames Direct is an American online eyewear retailer owned by EssilorLuxottica. The company sells eyewear products such as eyeglasses, prescription sunglasses, sunglasses, and contact lenses through its website, www.framesdirect.com. Frames Direct sells designer and brand-name eyewear products with over 50,000 models.

Founded in 1996, Frames Direct was one of the earliest online optical retail stores and the first to sell prescription sunglasses online.

== History ==
Co-founders Dhavid Cooper, OD and Guy Hodgson, OD are both originally from South Africa where they moved from to the United States in the 1980s. The two business partners had several optometry practices in Houston, Texas operating from 1986 until 1994 when they had an opportunity to sell their offices.

After taking a year off, the two co-founded FramesDirect in 1996 and launched FramesDirect.com later that year. The company was headquartered in Houston until Hurricane Rita and Hurricane Ike forced their customer service representatives to relocate to Austin, Texas, and eventually the rest of the office followed.

In 2010, Essilor, a prescription lens manufacturing company, acquired the majority stake in FramesDirect.com. Shortly after, Essilor partnered with FramesDirect.com to create and launch MyOpticalOnline.com, an online service that allows independent eyewear practices to sell their products online.

The company has been recognized by the MassMutual Financial Group and U.S. Chamber of Commerce with a Blue Chip Enterprise Award, and in 2000, FramesDirect.com was a finalist for the Ernst & Young Entrepreneur of the Year award.

== Operations ==
Frames Direct sells over 250 brand name frames such as Ray-Ban and Oakley, which consumers can search for and purchase on their own at any time on the company's website. Consumers can purchase frames, prescription eyeglasses, prescription or plain sunglasses, and contact lens refills. After choosing the desired frames, the consumer goes through a three-step process to order lenses including choosing the lens type, lens thickness, and optional enhancement features. FramesDirect.com has a customer service team staffed by opticians that are available on the phone or over online chat.

== Armed Forces Eyewear ==
Armed Forces Eyewear (AFEyewear) is a division of FramesDirect.com that provides additional discounts to military personnel and their families, the national guard, reserve members, veterans, and first responders. AFEyewear uses the customer's name and birth date to verify his or her active or former military status and then offers eyewear products with a 30 percent discount off the listed retail price. AFEyewear.com was merged into FramesDirect.com and is now offered as discounts via AFEyewear Member rewards.
