= Lozza (eyewear) =

Italian eyewear brand

- Founded: 1878; 148 years ago
- Founder: Giovanni Lozza
- Headquarters: Italy
- Products: Eyewear and Sunglasses
- Owner: De Rigo
- Website: www.lozzaocchiali.com

Lozza is an Italian luxury eyewear brand specializing in the manufacturing of sunglasses and optical frames. It is the oldest Italian eyewear company and one of the oldest eyewear companies in the world. Formed in 1878 by Giovanni Lozza and two travelling eyewear salesmen, who set up an eyewear factory in the Veneto region.

The brand is owned by De Rigo, a major Italian eyewear manufacturer.
