= Avraham Eilat =

Israeli artist and educator (born 1939)

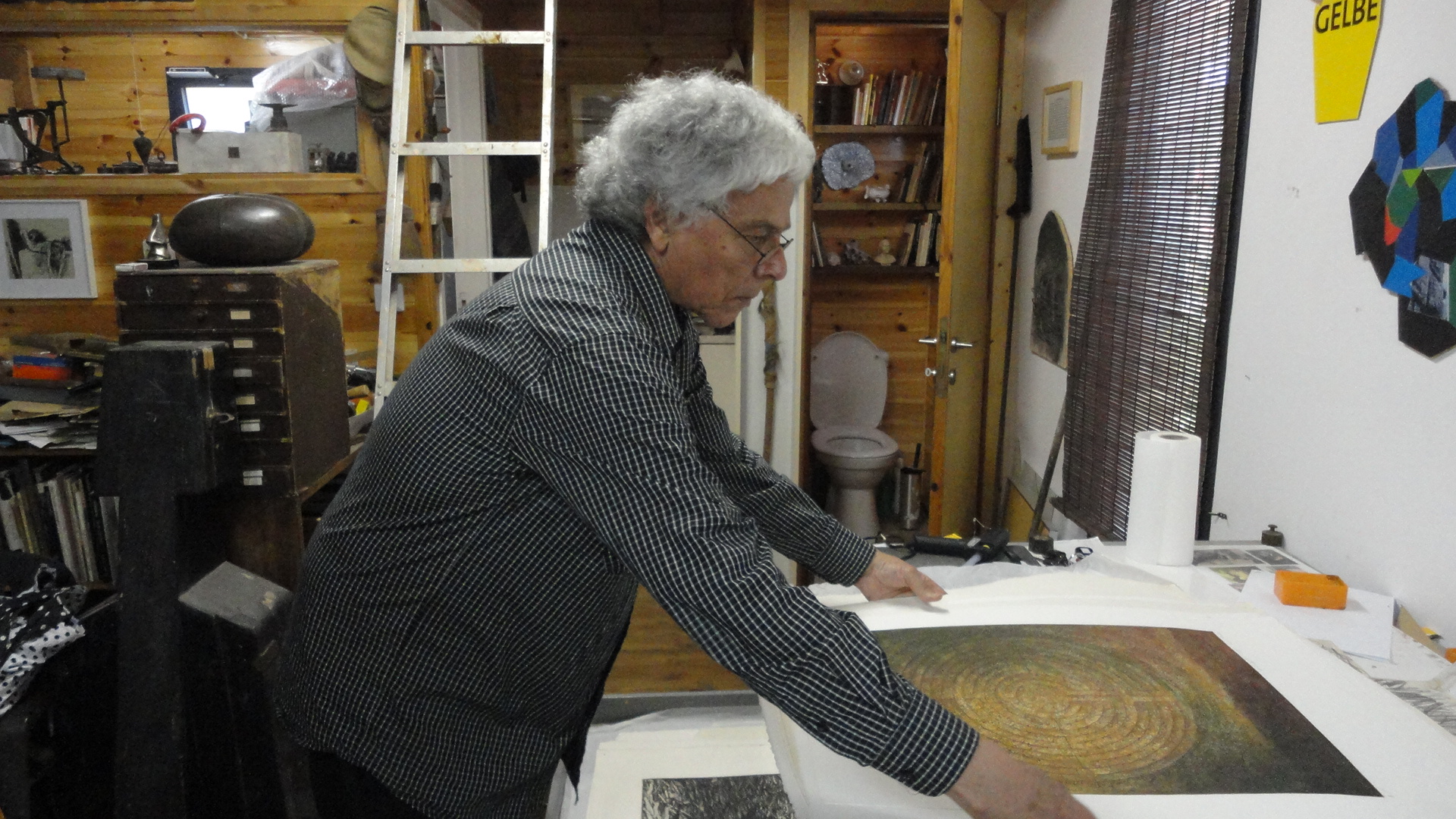
Avraham Eilat in his studio in 2013

Avraham Eilat (Hebrew: אברהם אילת; born 1939 in Tel Aviv, Mandatory Palestine) is an Israeli artist, educator and curator. He graduated from the Hebrew Gimnasium Herzliya in Tel Aviv and was enrolled in Hashomer Hatzair youth movement for nine years starting at age 9. After military service in 1960 he joined in Kibbutz Shamir, situated on the western slopes of the Golan Heights in the Upper Galilee, where he was a member until 1978. During his first years in the kibbutz, Eilat was a shepherd side-by-side with his kibbutz adopting father the painter Moshe Cagan. Close contact with nature and its phenomenon and the features of local landscape deeply influenced his way of thinking and established the themes appearing along all his career in his art. The contrast between man-made geometrical shapes of fish ponds and the free flowing of the flora and typical hilly landscape of the Hula Valley area, crystallized his visual language and determined its formal and thematic foundations. Avraham Eilat employs skillfully various means of expression: drawing and painting, etching, photography, sculpture, installation, and often a combination of more than one. Using those means enriches his basic statement and makes it complex and multi-layered. Avraham Eilat lives in Ein Hod Artists Village, Israel, with his spouse Margol Guttman, works in his studio in Pyramida Center of Contemporary Art, Wadi Salib, Haifa, and in his studio in Ein Hod.

- 1986 Co-founder of The Israeli Biennale of Photography, Ein Harod
- 1985–1987 Head of Photography Dept. Wizo Academy of Design, Haifa, Israel
- 1989–1991 Curator of photography, Haifa Museum of Art, Haifa, Israel
- 1994 Co-founder and chairman of Pyramida Centre for Contemporary Art, Haifa
- 1995–1999 Director of Pyramida Center of Contemporary Art
- 2000–2001 Director and chief curator of The Israeli Museum of Photography, Tel Hai
- 2003–2009 Director of Pyramida Center of Contemporary Art, Wadi Salib, Haifa
- Recently: curator of visual arts for the National Maritime Museum, Haifa

== Art studies ==
Avraham Eilat's art studies started when he was 14 years old. As a young pupil at the Herzliya Gimnasium in Tel Aviv he studied painting under Arie Allweil, who believed in his talent and invited him to stay with him and work under his guidance in the town of Tzfat (summer of 1954). During the years 1962–1965, parallel to working as shepherd in Kibbutz Shamir he was a part-time student in the Tel Aviv "High School of Painting", guided by the artist Arie Margoshilski, the founder and director the school. His diploma subject was "Quarry", a subject matter that kept coming up in his work in various versions through the years. In 1966, Avraham Eilat studied in the famous "Atelier 17", Paris, an international etching studio founded and directed by the English etcher Stanley William Hayter. In the workshop he met artists from different countries and became a close friend with the Japanese artist Kenji Yoshida, who in 1968 was his guest for two months in Kibbutz Shamir. They kept in touch until Yoshida's death in 2009.

In 1970, after participating in some exhibition in Israel and abroad, Eilat received a grant for overseas studies from the America-Israel Cultural Foundation, and studied at St. Martin's College of art in London. There he worked on sculpture under Anthony Caro and at the same time began to create experimental films under the guidance of the avant-garde film maker Malcolm Le Grice.

== Selected awards and grants ==
- 2004 Israeli Ministry of education and Culture prize
- 1997 Artist in Residence, Tisch School of the Arts, NYU, New York
- 1989 "Premio Cervo", Italy

== Selected solo exhibitions ==
- 2010 Psychophysical Time, Gallery G-art, Istanbul, Turkey
- 2009 The fear of what is suddenly too late, Galerie 21, Cologne, Germany
- 2009 Scratches – between drawing to photography, Wizo Academic Center, Haifa, Israel
- 2005 Psychophysical Time, Galeria Wschodnia, Lodz, Poland
- 2005 The Silence of the Sea, Israeli National Maritime Museum, Haifa, Israel
- 2004 Suspicious Symptoms, Tel Aviv Museum of Art, Israel
- 2003 Mortal, Pyramida Center for Contemporary Art, Haifa, Israel
- 2000 112 Portraits Front and Back, Galeria FF, Lodz, Poland
- 1992 From the Gut – From the Mind, The Israel Museum, Jerusalem, Israel
- 1981 Structures for a Given Interior, Haifa Museum of Art, Haifa, Israel

== Selected group exhibitions ==
- 2010 Wadi Saliv – Layers, Pyramida Center for Contemporary Art, Haifa, Israel
- 2009 Photography from Israel, Kultur Bahnhof Eller, Düsseldorf, Germany
- 2008 Twisted Reality, The Israeli Center for Digital Art, Holon, Israel
- 2008 The International Triennale of Contemporary Art, National Gallery in Prague
- 2006 Video Zero – Performing the Body, Haifa Museum of Art, Israel
- 2006 The Image of God, The Israel Museum, Jerusalem
- 2006 New Territories, De Hallen, Brugge, Belgium
- 2004 Video Zero – Towards Cinema, Haifa Museum of Art, Israel
- 2003 Video Zero – Communication Interference, Haifa Museum of Art, Israel
- 2001 Jewish Artists on the Edgde, Yeshiva University Museum, New York
- 1999 1st International Triennale of Installations, Haifa Museum of Art, Israel
- 1998 Milestones – Israeli Sculpture 1948–1998, The Open Museum, Tefen, Israel
- 1998 The Bridge, International art event, Melbourne, Australia
- 1987 Vom Landschaftsbild zur Spurensicherung, Ludwig Museum, Cologne, Germany

== Catalogues and books ==
- Fear, Artist Book, Jerusalem Print Workshop, Jerusalem, Israel
- The Silence of The Sea, catalogue recording exhibition at the National Maritime Museum, Haifa, Israel, texts by Joshua Sobol *and Avraham Eilat, 2006
- Suspicious Symptoms, catalogue, text by Shlomit Shaked, The Tel Aviv Museum of Art, Tel Aviv, 2004
- Mortal, catalogue, text by Carole Naggar, Pyramida Center for Art, Haifa, 2003
- The Armchair, artist book, text by J. Sobol, a numbered edition of 120 copies, 2002
- 112 Portraits Front & Back, catalogue, Galeria FF, Lodz, Poland, 2000
- Hieroglyphics of Reality, catalogue, texts by J. Sobol & A. Eilat, Tel Aviv, 1996
- From the Gut – From the Mind, catalogue, texts by Y. Safran, M. Perry-Lehman and N. Perez, The Israel Museum, Jerusalem, 1992
- A Painter with A Camera, photographs, texts by J. Sobol and Nissan Perez, Hakibbutz
- Structures for a Given Interior, catalogue, text by Yehudit Shen-dar, Haifa Museum of Art, Haifa 1981
- Avraham Eilat, by Rudolf Kreuzer, Perlinger Verlag, Vorgl, Austria, 1980
- Avraham Eilat, Drawings, catalogue, text by G. Tadmor, Haifa Museum of Art, 1975
- Avraham Eilat, catalogue, no text, Galerie Eremitage, Schwaz, Austria, 1969
