= Herzliya Conference =

International security conference in Israel

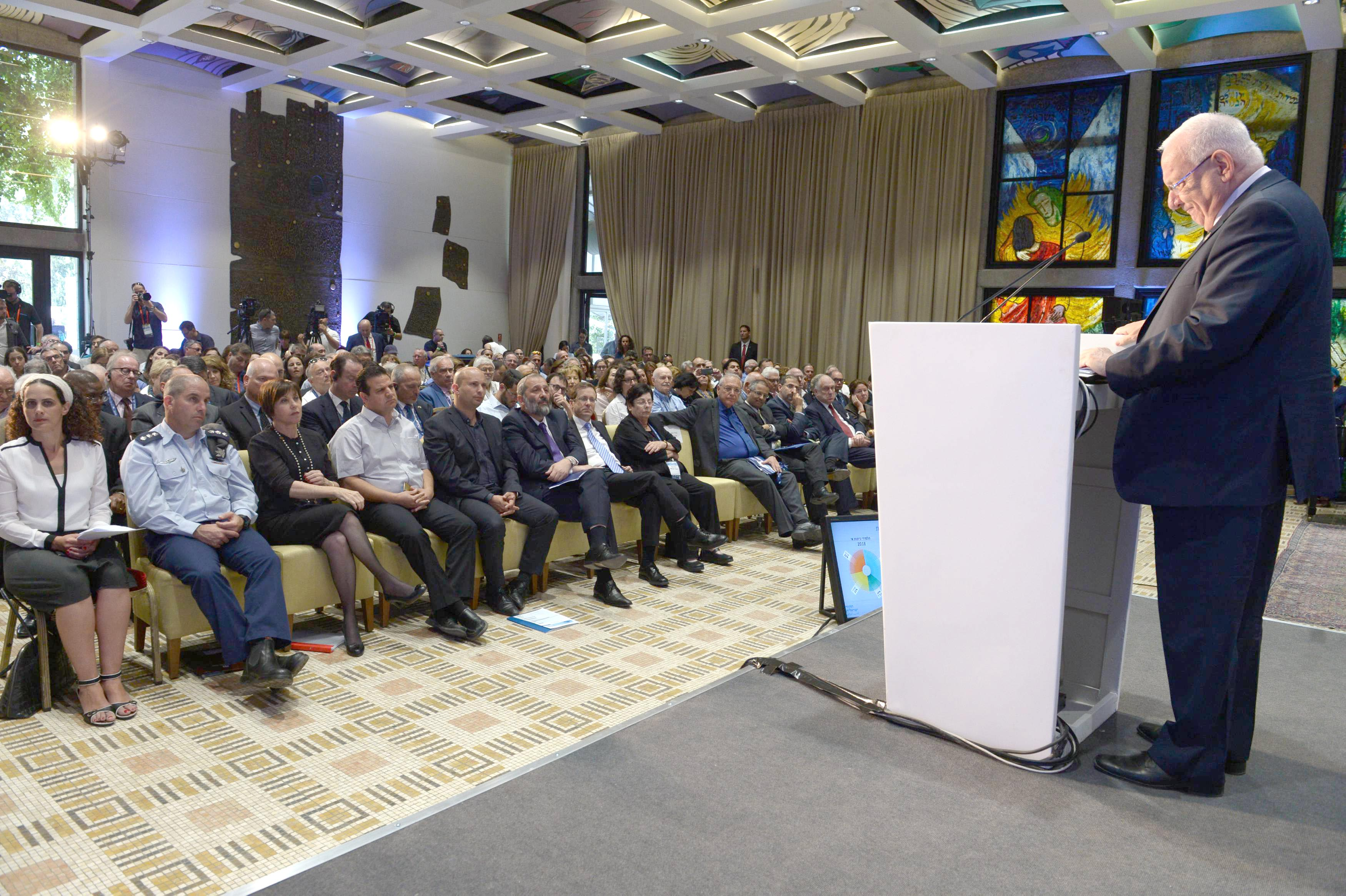
President of Israel Reuven Rivlin addressing Herzliya Conference, 2016

The Herzliya Conference is an annual summit held at Reichman University in Herzliya, Israel to discuss matters of state security and policy.

== History ==
The Herzliya Conference was established in December 2000 as a "closed-door annual gathering of the country's very top political, security, intelligence, and business elite". Its declared aim was “taking stock of Israel’s national security across a wide range of dimensions: the military balance, international diplomatic environment, economic health, social fabric, quality of education, government performance, and the Jewish world.”

Reichman's Institute for Policy and Strategy sponsors conference. The institute studies national policy with the aim of upgrading of the strategic decision-making process through policy-driven research and interaction between policy analysts and policy-makers. The institute is considered a world leader in risk assessment in the Middle East.

The European Leadership Network (ELNET) and the Forum of Strategic Dialogue (FSD) regularly host special roundtable sessions at the Herzliya Conference.

== Notable addresses ==
=== Ariel Sharon ===
Prime Minister Ariel Sharon delivered his most important foreign policy speeches at the Herzliya Conferences. His addresses at this forum were likened to the U.S. president's State of the Union address. At the third Herzliya Conference, Sharon announced his support for the Road map for peace and at the Fourth Herzliya Conference, he presented for the first time his unilateral disengagement plan.

=== Ehud Olmert ===
On January 24, 2006, Ehud Olmert, in his first major policy address since becoming Israel's acting prime minister, said at the Herzliya Conference that he backed the creation of a Palestinian state, and that Israel would have to relinquish parts of the West Bank to maintain Israel's Jewish majority.

== See also ==
- Munich Security Conference
- Halifax International Security Forum
