= Erker's Optical =

American optical company

Erker's Optical Co. of St. Louis, Missouri is an optical company started in 1879 by A.P. Erker. A.P. Erker's brother, Olympic gold medalist August Erker later joined the business. It was the first manufacturing optical firm in St. Louis and provided all manner of spectacles, opera and field glasses, telescopes, microscopes, artificial eyes, drawing instruments, magic lanterns and stereopticons. The company also provided a full line of mathematical and surveying instruments as well as providing a repair service for optical apparatus.

Mr. Erker was one of the official photographers of the 1904 World's Fair. Erker's is still run by the Erker family; the current president being Jack Erker Jr. Erker's owns many photos of the 1904 World's Fair, as the company sponsored its official photographer. Erker's also supplied Charles Lindbergh with the goggles that he used in his 1927 transatlantic flight in The Spirit of St. Louis.
