= Persol =

Sports eyewear company owned by EssilorLuxottica

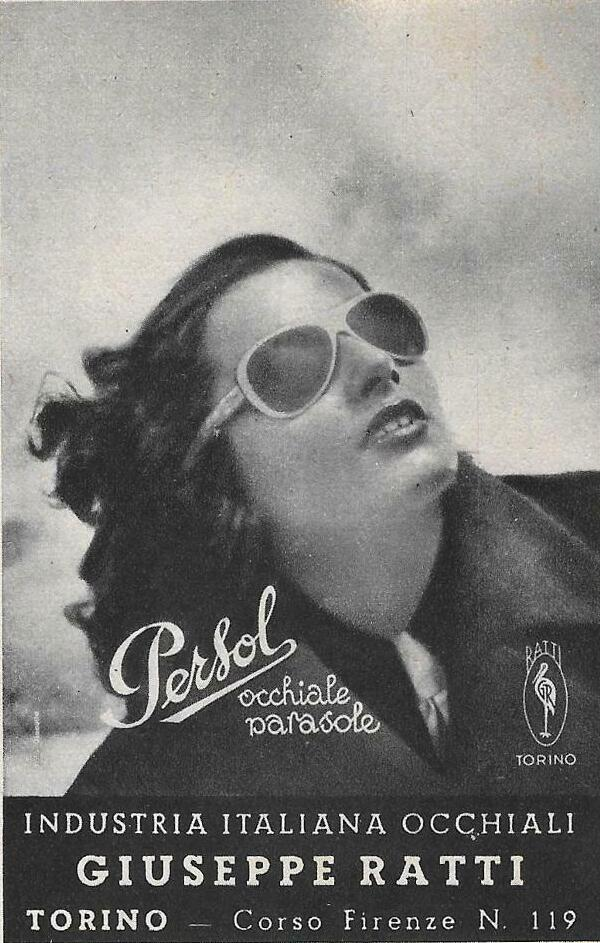
- 1940s publicity poster
- Founded: 1917; 109 years ago
- Founder: Giuseppe Ratti
- Headquarters: Turin, Italy
- Products: Eyewear and Sunglasses
- Owner: Luxottica
- Website: www.persol.com

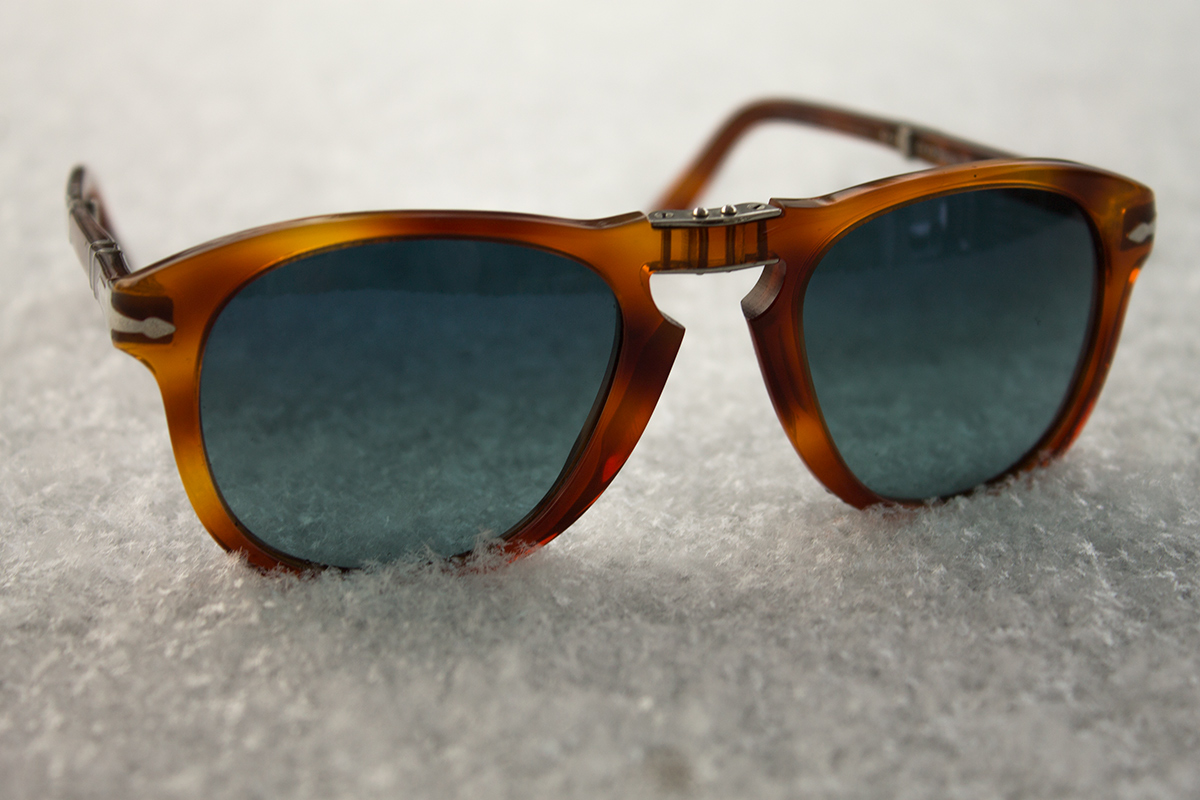
Persol Steve McQueen edition sunglasses

Persol is an Italian luxury eyewear brand specializing in the manufacturing of sunglasses and optical frames. It is one of the oldest eyewear companies in the world and is owned by the Luxottica group. The name is derived from the Italian per il sole, meaning "for the sun". Formed in 1917 by Giuseppe Ratti, Persol originally catered to pilots and sports drivers. Currently, the company markets durable sports sunglasses. The company trademark is a silver arrow.

== History ==
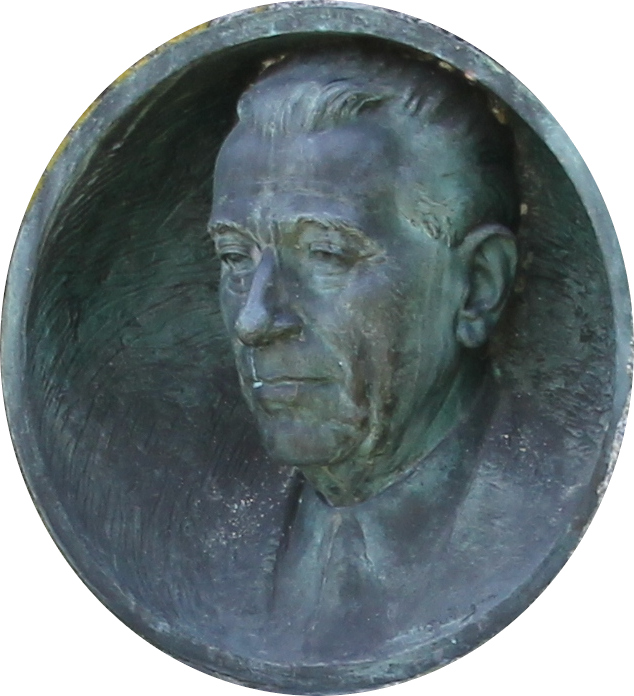
Giuseppe Ratti

In 1917 Giuseppe Ratti, owner of Berry optical, started producing his first glasses and lenses for athletes and aviators. The company developed a flexible stem, known as the patented Meflecto system, which was one of the first spring hinges for eyewear. Persol was introduced to the United States in 1962 and opened its first boutique on Rodeo Drive in Beverly Hills in 1991.

== Technology ==
Currently all plastic Persol spectacles are made in Italy using cellulose acetate.
