= List of Italians by net worth =

This is a list of Italian billionaires based on an annual assessment of wealth and assets compiled and published by Forbes magazine in 2026.

== 2026 Italian billionaires list ==
| World Rank | Name | Citizenship | Residence | Net worth (USD) | Source of wealth |
|---|---|---|---|---|---|
| 22 | Giancarlo Devasini | Italy; El Salvador | Roquebrune-Cap-Martin, France | 89.3 billion | Tether Limited |
| 41 | Giovanni Ferrero | Italy | Brussels, Belgium | 48.8 billion | Ferrero SpA |
| 46 | Andrea Pignataro | Italy | St. Moritz, Switzerland | 42.6 billion | ION Group |
| 53 | Paolo Ardoino | Italy; El Salvador | San José Villanueva, El Salvador | 38 billion | Tether Limited, Bitfinex |
| 289 | Francesco Gaetano Caltagirone | Italy | Rome, Italy | 11.1 billion | Caltagirone SpA |
| 381 | Massimiliana Landini Aleotti | Italy | Fiesole, Italy | 9.2 billion | Menarini |
| 461 | Piero Ferrari | Italy | Modena, Italy | 7.9 billion | Ferrari |
| 528 | Paolo Rocca | Italy; Argentina | Buenos Aires, Argentina | 7.3 billion | Techint |
| 528 | Gianfelice Rocca | Italy | Milan, Italy | 7.3 billion | Techint |
| 567 | Leonardo Maria Del Vecchio | Italy | Milan, Italy | 7 billion | EssilorLuxottica, Delfin |
| 595 | Paola Del Vecchio | Italy | Luxembourg, Luxembourg | 6.8 billion | EssilorLuxottica, Delfin |
| 595 | Nicoletta Zampillo | Italy | Monaco, Monaco | 6.8 billion | EssilorLuxottica, Delfin |
| 595 | Rocco Basilico | Italy | Los Angeles, United States | 6.8 billion | EssilorLuxottica, Delfin |
| 595 | Claudio Del Vecchio | Italy | Muttontown, United States | 6.8 billion | EssilorLuxottica, Delfin |
| 595 | Clemente Del Vecchio | Italy | Milan, Italy | 6.8 billion | EssilorLuxottica, Delfin |
| 595 | Luca Del Vecchio | Italy | London, United Kingdom | 6.8 billion | EssilorLuxottica, Delfin |
| 595 | Marisa Del Vecchio | Italy | Rome, Italy | 6.8 billion | EssilorLuxottica, Delfin |
| 664 | Giuseppe De'Longhi | Italy | Treviso, Italy | 6.3 billion | De' Longhi |
| 891 | Patrizio Bertelli | Italy | Milan, Italy | 4.8 billion | Prada |
| 891 | Miuccia Prada | Italy | Milan, Italy | 4.8 billion | Prada |
| 891 | Renzo Rosso | Italy | Bassano del Grappa, Italy | 4.5 billion | Diesel, OTB Group |
| 1011 | Luciano Benetton | Italy | Ponzano Veneto, Italy | 4.2 billion | Benetton Group |
| 1011 | Giuliana Benetton | Italy | Treviso, Italy | 4.2 billion | Benetton Group |
| 1074 | Giorgio Perfetti | Italy | Lugano, Switzerland | 4 billion | Perfetti Van Melle |
| 1108 | Remo Ruffini | Italy | Como, Italy | 3.9 billion | Moncler |
| 1108 | Sergio Stevanato | Italy | Venice, Italy | 3.9 billion | Stevanato Group |
| 1163 | Brunello Cucinelli | Italy | Solomeo, Italy | 3.7 billion | Brunello Cucinelli SpA |
| 1163 | Fabrizio Di Amato | Italy | Rome, Italy | 3.7 billion | Maire Tecnimont |
| 1189 | Augusto Perfetti | Italy | Lugano, Switzerland | 3.6 billion | Perfetti Van Melle |
| 1189 | Isabella Seràgnoli | Italy | Bologna, Italy | 3.6 billion | Coesia |
| 1325 | Romano Minozz | Italy | Spilamberto, Italy | 3.2 billion | Iris Ceramica Group, Snam, Eni |
| 1325 | Marina Berlusconi | Italy | Milan, Italy | 3.2 billion | Fininvest, Mondadori |
| 1325 | Pier Silvio Berlusconi | Italy | Arcore, Italy | 3.2 billion | Fininvest, Mondadori |
| 1440 | Massimo Doris | Italy | Milan, Italy | 2.9 billion | Banca Mediolanum |
| 1440 | Ugo Gussalli Beretta | Italy | Brescia, Italy | 2.9 billion | Beretta Holding |
| 1440 | Annalisa Doris | Italy | Segrate, Italy | 2.9 billion | Banca Mediolanum |
| 1440 | Lina Tombolato | Italy | Tombolo, Italy | 2.9 billion | Banca Mediolanum |
| 1504 | Luca Garavoglia | Italy | Milan, Italy | 2.8 billion | Campari Group |
| 1611 | Roberto Crippa | Italy | Milan, Italy | 2.6 billion | Technoprobe |
| 1611 | Cristiano Crippa | Italy | Milan, Italy | 2.6 billion | Technoprobe |
| 1676 | Gustavo Denegri | Italy | Turin, Italy | 2.5 billion | DiaSorin |
| 1676 | Nicola Bulgari | Italy | Rome, Italy | 2.5 billion | Bulgari |
| 1676 | Alberto Bombassei | Italy | Bergamo, Italy | 2.5 billion | Brembo |
| 1676 | John Elkann | Italy | Turin, Italy | 2.5 billion | Exor |
| 1676 | Alessandra Garavoglia | Italy | Milan, Italy | 2.5 billion | Campari Group |
| 1755 | Stefano Gabbana | Italy | Milan, Italy | 2.4 billion | Dolce & Gabbana |
| 1755 | Domenico Dolce | Italy | Milan, Italy | 2.4 billion | Dolce & Gabbana |
| 1834 | Sabrina Benetton | Italy | Treviso, Italy | 2.3 billion | Benetton Group |
| 1834 | Nerio Alessandri | Italy | Cesena, Italy | 2.3 billion | Technogym |
| 1913 | Pantaleo Dell'Orco | Italy | Milan, Italy | 2.2 billion | Armani |
| 1913 | Manfredi Lefebvre d'Ovidio | Italy | Monaco, Monaco | 2.2 billion | Heritage Group, Abercrombie and Kent |
| 1982 | Alberto Prada | Italy | Milan, Italy | 2.1 billion | Prada |
| 1982 | Marina Prada | Italy | Milan, Italy | 2.1 billion | Prada |
| 1982 | Paolo Bulgari | Italy | Rome, Italy | 2.1 billion | Bulgari |
| 2177 | Luigi Berlusconi | Italy | Macherio, Italy | 1.9 billion | Fininvest |
| 2177 | Eleonora Berlusconi | Italy | Macherio, Italy | 1.9 billion | Fininvest |
| 2177 | Mario Moretti Polegato | Italy | Crocetta del Montello, Italy | 1.9 billion | Geox |
| 2177 | Barbara Berlusconi | Italy | Milan, Italy | 1.9 billion | Fininvest |
| 2177 | Giovanni Arvedi | Italy | Cremona, Italy | 1.9 billion | Arvedi Group |
| 2177 | Massimo Moratti | Italy | Milan, Italy | 1.9 billion | Saras S.p.A. |
| 2177 | Barbara Benetton | Italy | Campodoro, Italy | 1.9 billion | Benetton Group |
| 2274 | Monica Crippa | Italy | Milan, Italy | 1.8 billion | Technoprobe |
| 2386 | Diego Della Valle | Italy | Sant'Elpidio a Mare, Italy | 1.7 billion | Tod's |
| 2386 | Mariarosa Lavelli | Italy | Milan, Italy | 1.7 billion | Technoprobe |
| 2386 | Sandro Veronesi | Italy | Milan, Italy | 1.7 billion | Oniverse |
| 2600 | Filippo Ghirelli | Italy | Monaco, Monaco | 1.5 billion | Infracorp, Genera Group |
| 2600 | Alessandro Rosano | Italy | Hong Kong, Hong Kong | 1.5 billion | HeyDude |
| 2712 | Susan Carol Holland | Italy; United Kingdom | Milan, Italy | 1.4 billion | Amplifon |
| 2712 | Luca Ferrari | Italy | Milan, Italy | 1.4 billion | Bending Spoons |
| 2858 | Antonio Percassi | Italy | Milan, Italy | 1.3 billion | Odissea Srl |
| 2858 | Helly Nahmad | Italy; United States; Brazil | Monaco, Monaco | 1.3 billion | art dealer |
| 2858 | Joseph Nahmad | Italy; United States | Monaco, Monaco | 1.3 billion | art dealer |
| 2858 | Francesco Patarnello | Italy | Moltrasio, Italy | 1.3 billion | Bending Spoons |
| 2858 | Luca Querella | Italy | Milan, Italy | 1.3 billion | Bending Spoons |
| 2858 | Matteo Danieli | Italy | Milan, Italy | 1.3 billion | Bending Spoons |
| 2858 | Yoni Nahmad | Italy; Israel | Monaco, Monaco | 1.3 billion | art dealer |
| 3017 | Danilo Iervolino | Italy | Rome, Italy | 1.2 billion | Multiversity |
| 3017 | Veronica Squinzi | Italy | Milan, Italy | 1.2 billion | Mapei |
| 3017 | Giuliana Caprotti | Italy | Milan, Italy | 1.2 billion | Esselunga |
| 3017 | Marina Caprotti | Italy | Milan, Italy | 1.2 billion | Esselunga |
| 3017 | Marco Squinzi | Italy | Milan, Italy | 1.2 billion | Mapei |
| 3017 | Simona Giorgetta | Italy | Milan, Italy | 1.2 billion | Mapei |
| 3185 | Luigi Cremonini | Italy | Modena, Italy | 1.1 billion | Inalca SpA |
| 3185 | Silvana Armani | Italy | Milan, Italy | 1.1 billion | Armani |
| 3185 | Andrea Della Valle | Italy | Casette D'Ete, Italy | 1.1 billion | Tod's |
| 3185 | Fulvio Montipò | Italy | Reggio Emilia, Italy | 1.1 billion | Interpump Group |
| 3185 | Leone Benetton | Italy | Treviso, Italy | 1.1 billion | Benetton Group |
| 3332 | Rosanna Armani | Italy | Milan, Italy | 1 billion | Armani |
| 3332 | Federico De Nora | Italy | Milan, Italy | 1 billion | De Nora |
| 3332 | Andrea Camerana | Italy | Milan, Italy | 1 billion | Armani |

== See also ==
- The World's Billionaires
- List of countries by the number of billionaires
