= Del Vecchio (surname) =

Del Vecchio (Italian pronunciation: [del ˈvɛkkjo]) is an Italian surname literally meaning "of the old man". Notable people with the name include:

== Del Vecchio or del Vecchio ==
- Del Vecchio family, Italian business family
  - Leonardo Del Vecchio (1935–2022), Italian businessman
  - Claudio Del Vecchio, Italian businessman, son of Leonardo Del Vecchio
  - Leonardo Maria Del Vecchio, Italian businessman, son of Leonardo Del Vecchio
- Denise Del Vecchio, Brazilian actress
- Domitilla Del Vecchio, Italian control theorist
- Emanuele Del Vecchio, Brazilian football player
- Giorgio Del Vecchio, Italian legal philosopher
- Giuditta del Vecchio, Italian actress
- Hugo del Vecchio, Argentine basketball player
- José Del Vecchio, Venezuelan sports medicine specialist and youth baseball pioneer in his country
- Kenneth del Vecchio, American politician and filmmaker
- Mauro Del Vecchio (1946–2025), Italian Army general and politician

== Delvecchio ==
- Alex Delvecchio (1931–2025), Canadian ice hockey player, coach, and general manager
- Gennaro Delvecchio, Italian football player
- Marco Delvecchio, Italian football player
- Paul DelVecchio, DJ better known as Pauly D, from the reality TV show Jersey Shore

== Fictional characters ==
- Al Delvecchio, from the TV series Happy Days, played by Al Molinaro
- Dominick Delvecchio, from the TV series Delvecchio, played by Judd Hirsch
- Ozzy Delvecchio, from the TV series Bloodline, played by John Leguizamo
- Sly Delvecchio, from the film Passenger 57, played by Tom Sizemore
- Tony Delvecchio and Angela Delvecchio, from the video game series Backyard Sports

== See also ==
- Vecchio (surname)
