= InvestiRE =

Italian real estate company

Investire SGR
- Type: Private Company
- Industry: Real estate, asset management
- Founded: 2015
- Headquarters: Rome, Milan
- Key people: Dario Valentino - CEO
- Products: Asset management, Real Estate
- Number of employees: 143
- Website: www.investiresgr.it/en

Investire SGR is an independent real estate asset management firm with approximately €7 billion in assets under management. The company is the result of the merger of three real estate asset management companies: Investire Immobiliare SGR, Polaris Real Estate SGR and Beni Stabili Gestioni SGR. The real estate portfolio managed by Investire SGR is located all over Italy, across different market sectors, including office, retail, healthcare and social housing.

== Shareholding Structure ==
The main shareholders of the companies are Beni Stabili, the listed owner of the former Beni Stabili Gestioni SGR, Banca Finnat, Fondazione Cariplo, Italian surveyors' pension scheme CIPAG and Fondazione Cassa dei Risparmi di Forlì.

== Portfolio Strategies ==
Investire's portfolio is composed of long term office and residential investments as well as development projects in the Social Housing sector and special purpose buildings. In 2015, as part of a portfolio rotation strategy, InvestiRE has sold a number of assets in Italy to primary international real estate investors.

In August 2026 Investire, the company that owns the former INPDAP headquarters in Rome where the Spin Time Labs social space is located, has stated that “the legal and safety conditions required to allow the use of the building are not met”, and, according to the mayor of Rome Roberto Gualtieri, it has rejected the City of Rome’s offer to purchase it, thereby effectively putting an end to the independent social and housing initiative and leaving the 400 people who had been living in the building until the previous week out on the street to face an uncertain future.
