= Del Vecchio =

Del Vecchio may refer to:

- Del Vecchio (guitar maker), guitarmaking company
- Del Vecchio (surname)
- Delvecchio (TV series), American drama television series
- Joseph Del Vecchio (1885 1971), French footballer
