= Francesco Milleri =

Italian businessman (born 1959)

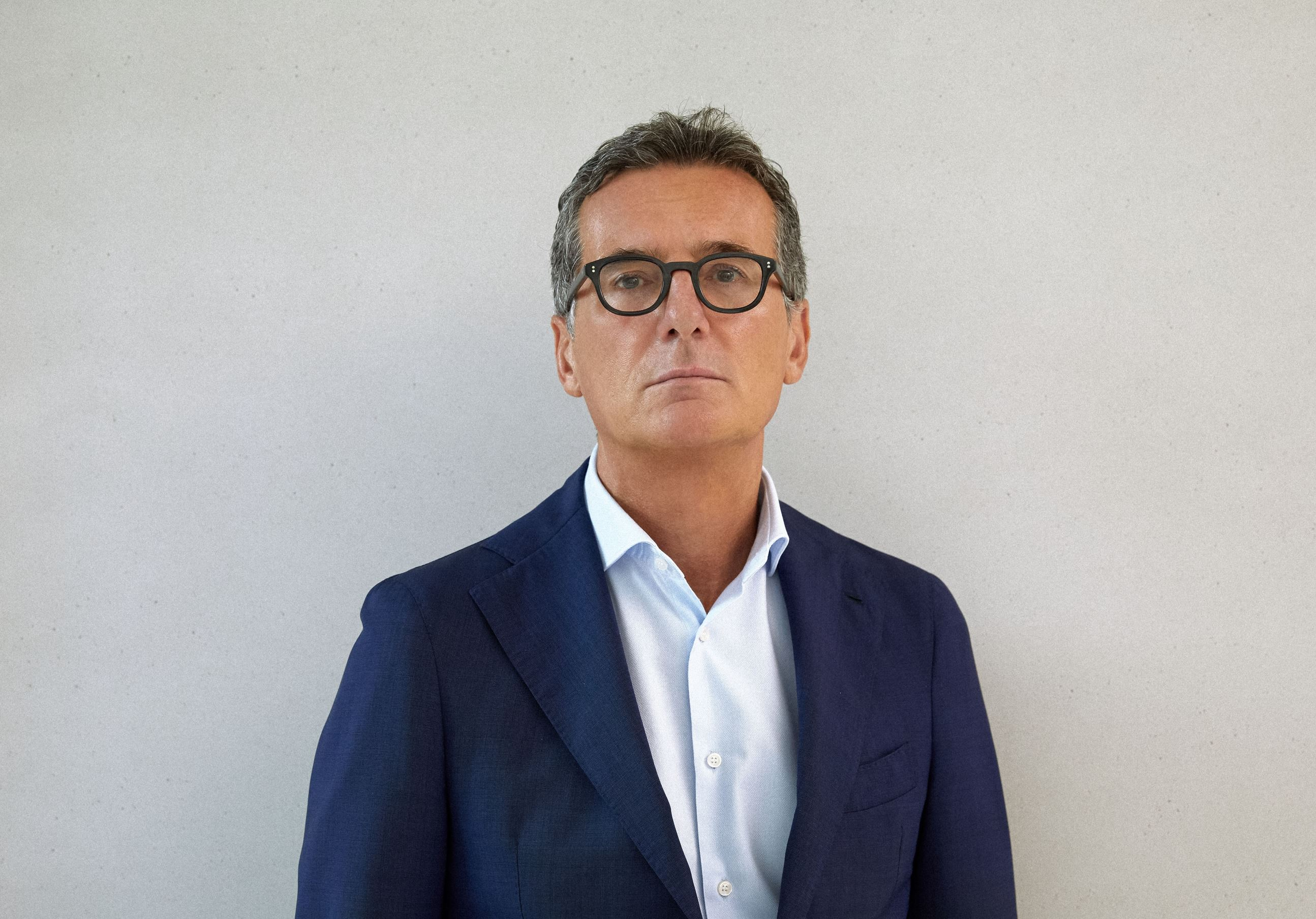
- Francesco Milleri
- Born: 1959 (age 66–67); Città di Castello, Italy
- Education: University of Florence; Bocconi University
- Occupation: Business executive
- Title: CEO, EssilorLuxottica
- Predecessor: Massimo Vian
- Children: Matteo Milleri

Francesco Milleri (born 1959) is an Italian businessman who has been the CEO of EssilorLuxottica since June 2022. He is also the father of Italian-American DJ and record producer Matteo Milleri.

== Early life ==
Francesco Milleri was born in 1959. He graduated from the University of Florence with a bachelor of laws, and earned a master in business administration from Bocconi University. He was also awarded a two-year Donato Menichella scholarship from the Bank of Italy at the New York University Stern School of Business.

== Career ==
Milleri worked as a business consultant. In 1996 he founded Abstract, a strategic digital consultancy company.

Following the 2006 acquisition of iDoq, a company specializing in document flow automation and owner of the Lucy Star digitization platform, Abstract began collaborating with Campari, Barilla, and Luxottica. Subsequently, Francesco Milleri was entrusted with leading the digitization phase of Luxottica’s business processes. At the end of this ten-year period, Leonardo Del Vecchio wanted Milleri to stay in the company on a permanent basis, and appointed him first Director with deputy functions and later Vice-president. He later became the deputy chairman of Luxottica, and succeeded Massimo Vian as its CEO in December 2017. Under his leadership, in 2018 the operation that led to the birth of EssilorLuxottica was completed.

He was appointed executive co-delegate in May 2019, and CEO in 2020. In May 2021, Francesco Milleri was confirmed as EssilorLuxottica CEO. On 28 June 2022, he was appointed chairman of EssilorLuxottica following Leonardo Del Vecchio's death, and in early June 2022, he was also appointed chairman of Del Vecchio's family holding company Delfin.

== Other roles ==
- Assistant professor of political economy at his alma mater, the University of Florence
- Director of the Leonardo Del Vecchio Foundation
