= Fidessa =

British financial services company

Fidessa Group Holdings Ltd
- Type: Subsidiary
- Industry: Software
- Founded: 1981 (45 years ago)
- Headquarters: London, United Kingdom
- Products: Trading & investment management systems; Analytics & market data
- Revenue: £353.9 million (2017)
- Operating income: £49.6 million (2017)
- Net income: £35.7 million (2017)
- Parent: ION Investment Group
- Website: www.fidessa.com

Fidessa group Holdings Ltd (formerly Fidessa Group Plc), is a British-headquartered company which provides financial markets software and services, such as trading and investment management systems, analytics and market data, to buy side and sell side clients in the financial services sector.

It was listed on the London Stock Exchange and was a member of the FTSE 250 Index before it was acquired by ION Investment Group, which also owns financial content provider Dealogic and financial media group Acuris.

== History ==
The company was founded in 1981 as Intercom Data Systems (IDS) and was later renamed Royalblue Group plc, which consisted of two separate operating divisions, Royalblue Financial and Royalblue Technologies. With the group's core trading platform, Fidessa, being better known in the market place, the Royalblue Group plc changed its name to Fidessa Group plc following shareholder approval at the AGM held in April 2007. In November 2008, Fidessa launched its Fidessa Fragmentation Index. In April 2011, Fidessa launched the Tradalyzer that provides detailed trading analysis.

On 20 February 2018, it was announced that Temenos Group was in advanced talks to purchase Fidessa. The following day, Fidessa's board recommended that shareholders accept an offer of £35.67 per share to purchase the company, valuing it at £1.4 billion. This offer was later beaten in April 2018, by ION Investment Group who offered £39.50 per share, valuing the company at £1.5 billion.

== Operations ==
=== Market penetration ===
As of early 2009, around 70% of all securities transactions in London were reportedly handled by Fidessa systems.

=== Products ===
In addition to a trading platform, Fidessa hosts a broker neutral FIX-enabled execution network. This has a large number of brokers connected to it and is similar to other inhouse FIX networks, such as the LSE Hub, the SunGard Transaction Network (STN) and Thomson Reuters subsidiary TradeWeb's Autex Trade Route.
