= Denegri =

Denegri is an Italian surname. Notable people with the surname include:

- Alberto Denegri, Peruvian football player
- Aurelio Denegri, Prime Minister of Peru in 1881
- Gustavo Denegri (born 1937), Italian billionaire, chairman of DiaSorin
- Jerko Ješa Denegri (born 1936), Serbian art historian and art critic
- Marco Aurelio Denegri (1938–2018), Peruvian intellectual
- Natalia Denegri (born 1976), Argentine producer and writer
