= Krogerus =

Finnish law firm

- Headquarters: Fabianinkatu 9 Helsinki, Finland
- No. of employees: approximately 260
- Major practice areas: General practice
- Key people: Mårten Knuts (Managing Partner)
- Revenue: ▲€53 million (2023)
- Website: www.krogerus.com

Krogerus is one of the largest business law firms in Finland. It is headquartered in Helsinki and has offices in Kuopio and Turku. The firm's revenue was approximately €53 million, as of the financial period ending 31 March 2023. Krogerus employs approximately 260 professionals.

The firms practice covers a broad spectrum of transactional, dispute and resolution, and regulatory matters. They have particular focuses in the energy, finance, food and beverage, healthcare, real estate, technology and telecommunications sectors. Krogerus is regularly retained in some of the most high-profile assignments in the Finnish market.

== Rankings and recognition ==
Krogerus' lawyers are ranked in the top tiers by leading legal guides such as Chambers & Partners, The Legal 500 and IFLR 1000. In 2023, Krogerus was awarded Finland's Law Firm of the Year 2023 title by Chambers and Partners. Additionally, the firm received Excellence in Client Relations recognition in Regi's Law Firm of the Year 2023 Finland study.

Krogerus has one of the largest and most active corporate/M&A practice groups in the Finnish market; the firm has ranked in the top of Mergermarket's M&A league tables for Finland by deal count for several years.

The firm's partners have also received awards such as Best Lawyers "Lawyer of the Year" and the International Law Office (ILO) Client Choice Award.

== Main practice areas ==
The firm's main practice areas include:

- Banking & Finance
- Capital Markets
- Commercial Contracts and Outsourcing
- Competition and Regulatory
- Compliance, Investigations and Corporate Offences
- Corporate Advisory
- Dispute Resolution
- Employment & Benefits
- Energy
- Environment
- Intellectual Property
- Mergers & Acquisitions
- Private Equity
- Public Procurement
- Real Estate & Construction
- Restructuring and Insolvency
- Tax
- Technology & Data Protection

== Main industrial sectors ==
The firm's main industrial sectors include:

- Energy & Infrastructure
- Financial Institutions & Insurance
- Food & Beverage
- Healthcare & Pharmaceuticals
- Machinery & Engineering
- Public Sector
- Real Estate
- Retail & Consumer Goods
- Technology, Media & Telecommunications
- Transportation & Logistics
