= Cremonini =

Cremonini, an Italian surname, can refer to:

- Cesare Cremonini (musician) (born 1980), Italian singer
- Cesare Cremonini (philosopher) (1550–1631), Italian professor of natural philosophy
- Giovanni Battista Cremonini (1550–1610), Italian painter
- Giuseppe Cremonini (1866–1903), Italian operatic tenor
- Leonardo Cremonini (1925–2010), Italian visual artist
- Luigi Cremonini (born 1939), Italian billionaire businessman
