= Andrea Pignataro =

Italian entrepreneur

- Born: 10 June 1970 (age 56); Bologna, Italy
- Education: University of Bologna; Imperial College London
- Title: Founder of ION Group

Andrea Pignataro (born June 10, 1970 in Bologna) is an Italian billionaire, entrepreneur and mathematician based in Switzerland. He is the founder of the ION Group, which develops software for the financial sector. According to Forbes, he was the second-richest Italian in November 2025 with a personal net worth of US$36.5 billion.

== Career ==
He was born in Bologna in 1970, graduated in economics from the University of Bologna and went on to obtain a PhD in mathematics from Imperial College London. He began working in 1994 as a bond trader for Salomon Brothers, a major US investment bank at the time, which was taken over by Citigroup in the late 1990s.

In 1997, Pignataro founded the ION Investment Group in London, a software provider formed as a joint venture between Salomon, which soon became part of Citigroup, and List, a Pisa-based software company specializing in government bond trading, which was acquired by ION in 2020. In 1999, Andrea Pignataro left Salomon Brothers in London to establish ION as an independent company. Under Pignataro's leadership, ION became one of the leading software companies in the financial sector, particularly in the area of trading software.

In 2021, Pignataro invested over €3 billion in the acquisition of Cedacri and then Cerved, two companies that provide IT services for banks and data collection for company financial statements. The holding company then invested €1.35 billion to gain control of Prelios (formerly Pirelli Reale Estate) and took over the company in July 2024. He also owns shares in a number of other companies, including sportswear manufacturer Macron.

== Legal problems ==
In 2025, Pignataro was investigated for €500 million of tax evasion between 2013 and 2023 by the Italian revenue agency. Calculating interest, he was due to pay approximately €1.2 billion; however he managed a deal with the agency for €280 million to be paid in five installments.

== Personal life ==
Pignataro lives in St. Moritz in Switzerland, is married and is considered a passionate sailor. According to Forbes, he owns a collection of luxury villas and hotels on the island of Canouan (part of St. Vincent and the Grenadines) in the Caribbean. Pignataro himself lives a secluded and private life.
