= Algernon Charles Holland =

British businessman

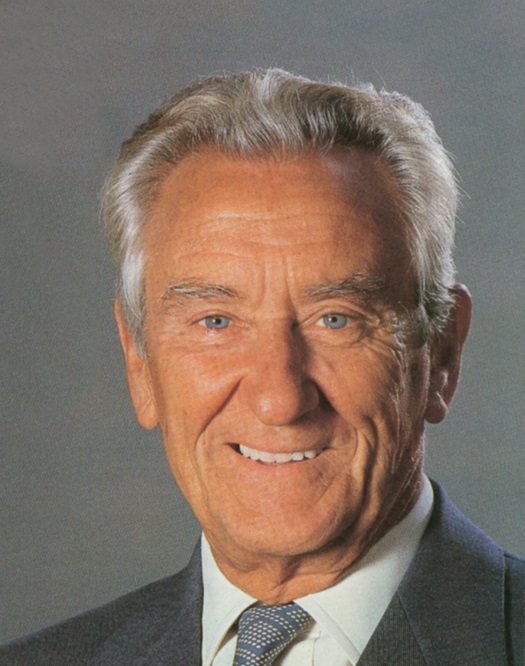
- Born: 10 February 1919
- Died: 2001 (aged 81–82)
- Citizenship: British
- Occupation: Businessman
- Known for: Founder of Amplifon
- Spouse: Anna Maria Formiggini (m. 1950)
- Children: Susan Carol Holland

Algernon Charles Holland MBE MC (10 February 1919 – 2001) was a British businessman, and the founder of Amplifon, a company that supplies hearing aids.

== Early life ==
Holland was born on 10 February 1919 in Horsham, Sussex. His father, Algernon Holland, a Captain in the Royal Air Force, died in the First World War, on 21 September 1918, before he was born. His father was serving with 249 Squadron, Seaplane Station, Dundee, when their Curtiss-H16 "Large America" flying boat "struck a ship's mast on the river Tay, crashed and burst into flames". He is buried at the Dundee Eastern Necropolis. He was the son of Arthur and Amy Holland of Horsham, Sussex.

His mother, Helen Ruth Menzies, was Scottish, born in Argentina, of Quinta Rannock, San Ferriemdo, Buenos Aires, Argentina, and in 1921, they moved to Buenos Aires, and he was educated there at the English College.

== Second World War ==
In the Second World War, Holland served with Special Operations Executive. He was a Major in the Royal Corps of Signals.

=== Honours, decorations ===
He was awarded an MBE, and a Military Cross in 1945. The MBE was awarded in 1943 for his services in Greece. In 1948, the US awarded him the Bronze Star Medal.

- Member of the Order of the British Empire
  Capt. HOLLAND was dropped into the PELOPONNESE as Signals Officer in Sep 43. On 7 Oct he went down to AIYION where he remained for several days to arrange the tapping of German telephone wires. He carried out his work successfully, working in a building on which there was a German guard. Capt. HOLLAND has made extensive tours of the PELOPONNESE to ensure the correct working of the wireless links. These journeys have always been made without Andarte protection and often when German drives were taking place in the area. At all times Capt. HOLLAND has shown complete disregard for danger and a great technical efficiency.
  4 January 1945
- Military Cross
  Major HOLLAND was infiltrated by parachute into the APPENNINES in July 1944. His object was to unite the various formations of partisans into a disciplined force under a joint command. Despite many difficulties and political differences, and although constantly attacked by enemy troops, was successful in building up a formidable Partisan Force in this area. During the exceptionally hard winter these attacks by the enemy increased in violence and the Partisan Formations were threatened with total destruction. By his personal efforts, Major HOLLAND not only kept his men under control and maintained their morale at a high level, but was also able to organise and execute frequent sabotage attacks and ambushes on enemy lines of communication. Under his personal guidance and leadership the Partisans accounted for over 70 enemy vehicles, 200 men killed and more than 300 wounded and captured. He operated in enemy occupied territory for 8 months, during the whole of which time he had to live under conditions of great disconfort, constantly on the move to avoid capture often without food and subjected to constant attacks by the enemy.
  2 august 1948
- Bronze Star Medal
  Algernon Charles HOLLAND, M.B.E., Major, Royal Corps of Signals, for meritorious achievement in connection with military operations in Italy from June 1944 to 1 May 1945. Major Holland was dropped by parachute into enemy-occupied Italian territory in June 1944, rendered valuable service through his work organizing Partisan forces, and at great risk to his own personal safety dispatched to Headquarters Fifth Army intelligence which proved to be invaluable, including road checks on vehicles, reports on interrogation of prisoners of war, information on enemy units, and location of dumps and other air force targets. The intelligence received from Major Holland was of great assistance in maintaining German Order of Battle and through his hard work, determination, and perseverance, under the most difficult circumstances, G-2 Fifth Army was materially assisted in the successful accomplishment of its intelligence mission.
  19 november 1948

== Career ==
Holland founded Amplifon in Milan, Italy in 1950, in part because of his experience with servicemen suffering hearing loss in the war, and because of the invention of the transistor in the late 1940s.

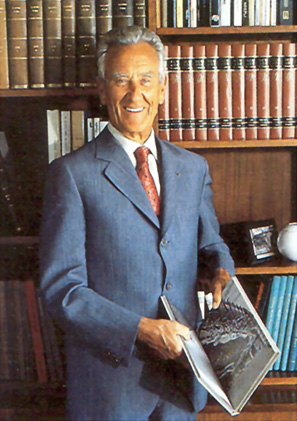
Algernon Charles Holland (Amplifon)

In 1971, he founded the independent not-for-profit Centre for Research and Studies (CRS) in Milan, to co-ordinate research into audiology and related areas.

== Personal life ==
In 1950, Holland married Anna Maria Formiggini. She has been a director of Amplifon since 1980, chair since 1990, and honorary chair since 2011.

Their daughter Susan Carol Holland has been chair of Amplifon since 2011. She owns 44.9% of Amplifon through her family's holding company.

Algernon Holland died in 2001.

== Legacy ==
The Amplifon Awards for Brave Britons was established in his honour, with Falklands war veteran Simon Weston as head of the judging panel.
