= Vecchio (surname) =

Vecchio is an Italian language surname, meaning literally "old man" or more correctly Elder as in the case of Pliny the Elder or Bruegel the Elder, and is a sign of respect. The name is equivalent to Sheikh (Elder) in Arabic. Notable people with the surname include:

- Carlos Vecchio (born 1969), Venezuelan lawyer, politician and social activist
- Diego Vecchio (born 1969), Argentine writer
- Emiliano Vecchio (born 1988), Argentine footballer
- José Grasso Vecchio, Venezuelan lawyer and financial analyst
- Karen Vecchio (born 1971), Canadian politician
- Mary Ann Vecchio (born 1955), American photographer
- Palma Vecchio (c. 1480–1528), Venetian painter

== See also ==
- Del Vecchio (surname)
