= Acuris =

Financial news and data firm

- Formerly: Mergermarket Group
- Type: Subsidiary
- Founded: December 1999; 26 years ago
- Founders: Caspar Hobbs; Charlie Welsh; Gawn Rowan Hamilton
- Headquarters: London, United Kingdom
- Parent: ION Investment Group
- Website: www.acuris.com

Acuris is a British financial news and data firm known for its fixed income research provider Debtwire and Mergermarket, a specialist in M&A intelligence. It is owned by ION Investment Group, a financial software and data business which owns Fidessa and Dealogic. ION Investment Group bought the company from BC Partners, a private equity group, and GIC Private Limited, Singapore's sovereign wealth fund, in 2019.

Formerly known as Mergermarket Group, the company has 1,300 staff, including 600 journalists and analysts, in 67 locations around the world, with regional hubs in London, New York, Mumbai and Hong Kong.

== History ==
Acuris began with a single product, Mergermarket, which was established in December 1999 by founders Caspar Hobbs, Charlie Welsh and Gawn Rowan Hamilton. Its founding idea was that in the M&A market, “There is a lot of information out there but very little intelligence.”

In August 2006 the company, then known as Mergermarket Ltd, was acquired by The Financial Times Group for £101m, publisher of the Financial Times newspaper and FT.com. FT Group was a division of Pearson PLC, the international media group.

In 2013, the company was renamed to Mergermarket Group. In November 2013, Pearson agreed to sell Mergermarket Group to London private equity investor BC Partners in a transaction valuing the business intelligence and news service at £382m including debt. Based on the deal, Mergermarket Group was valued at 15 times its last year operating income.

On 15 January 2014, Moody's Investors Service assigned a B3 corporate family rating to the Mergermarket Group.

In July 2017, the Mergermarket Group rebranded as Acuris. The announcement of this move fueled speculation that a sale of the company might come in the next year. Indeed, BC Partners sold a minority stake of around 30% to Singapore sovereign wealth fund GIC in July 2017.

In May 2019, BC Partners sold a majority stake in Acuris to ION Investment Group, a financial software and data business which owns Fidessa, in an £1.35bn deal. BC Partners will retain a 25% stake in the company, while GIC is selling out.

== Acquisitions and divestitures ==
- 2007 – acquired Infinata
- 2010 – acquired Xtract Research
- 2012 – acquired Inframation Group
- 2013 – Sale of MergerID
- 2014 – acquired Perfect Information
- 2014 – acquired Law Report Group
- 2015 – acquired AVCJ and Unquote
- 2015 – acquired C6 Group
- 2016 – acquired Creditflux
- 2017 – Sale of Infinata
- 2017 – acquired TIM Group
- 2018 – acquired Spark Spread
- 2019 – acquired Blackpeak
