= Allegro Development Corporation =

Developer of commodity management software

Allegro Development Corp.
- Company type: Subsidiary
- Industry: Computer software, IT services
- Founded: 1984
- Headquarters: Dallas, Texas, United States
- Products: Allegro Horizon
- Parent: ION Group
- Website: www.allegrodev.com

Allegro Development Corporation is a maker of commodity management software for power and gas utilities, industrial energy consumers, refiners, producers and traders of crude oil and producers and traders of oil products and soft and agricultural commodities.

Headquartered in Dallas, Texas, Allegro has offices in Calgary, Dubai, Houston, London, Singapore, Zurich and Jakarta along with a global network of partners.

== History ==
Allegro was founded in 1984 by Eldon Klaassen. The company was the first to develop an enterprise software platform designed specifically to manage trading, risk management, and logistics associated with physical commodities.

In May 2015 Frank Brienzi was appointed CEO. The company acquired Singapore-based agriculture commodities solution provider JustCommodity in June 2015.

In April 2019, Allegro was acquired by ION Group.

=== 2013 Governance Litigation ===
In June 2013, Eldon Klaassen, founder and former CEO of Allegro, sued the company and directors Mick Pehl, Bob Forlenza, Patrich Simpkins, and Ray Hood for fiduciary breach. On October 16, 2013, Vice Chancellor J. Travis Laster handed down a 56-page memorandum opinion that said the claims asserted by Eldon Klaassen were barred because of his delay in bringing his suit.

== Products ==
The company’s primary product is Allegro Horizon, an enterprise-level risk management architecture. The software is used by traders, risk managers, and decision-makers across the globe, including energy industry companies.
