= DiaSorin =

Italian biotechnology company

Diasorin S.p.A.
- Type: Public
- Traded as: BIT: DIA; FTSE MIB
- Industry: Biotechnology
- Founded: 2000; 26 years ago
- Headquarters: Saluggia, Italy
- Key people: Gustavo Denegri (chairman); Carlo Rosa (CEO)
- Products: In vitro diagnostics instruments and services
- Website: diasoringroup.com

Diasorin S.p.A. is an Italian multinational biotechnology company that produces and markets in vitro diagnostics reagent kits used in immunodiagnostics and molecular diagnostics and since July 2021, it is also active in the Life Science business. The group was founded in 2000 and is headquartered in Saluggia, Italy. Its production is at several plants located in Europe and the United States: Saluggia and Gerenzano (Italy), Dietzenbach (Germany), Stillwater, Minnesota (US), Dartford (UK). Following the acquisition of Luminex, the company acquired five additional production plants located in the United States (Austin, Madison, Chicago, and Seattle) and in Canada (Toronto). The company is a constituent of the FTSE MIB index.

The Group is mainly active in the development, production and marketing of diagnostic tests used by the medical community to assess a patient's values, understand their state of health or monitor the progression of a disease.

Diasorin offers diagnostic assays employing two of the most common technologies in in vitro diagnostics: immunodiagnostics and molecular diagnostics. Both technologies are based on automated technological platforms developed by Diasorin in collaboration with partner companies on specifications provided by Diasorin.

Diasorin's "core business" is the design and development of diagnostic test kits (reagents) that run on such platforms.

Diasorin also focuses on the development of research and laboratory kits in the field of molecular diagnostics, particularly specializing in the infectious diseases sector with tests that use different matrices including blood, cerebrospinal fluid, cutaneous and mucus swabs.

== Activities ==
Diasorin focuses its efforts on several fields of immunodiagnostics: infectious diseases, bone and mineral, endocrinology, hypertension, oncology, gastrointestinal infections, autoimmunity and brain and cardiac markers.

The company is also active in molecular diagnostics for infectious diseases and for the detection of some forms of leukemia.

In 2021 Diasorin also entered into the Life Science space, through the acquisition of Luminex Corporation, gaining access to its Multi-Analyte Profiling (xMAP) technology and to its Flow Cytometry business

Diasorin develops, manufactures and markets tests for the diagnosis of infectious diseases or hormonal disorders. The immunodiagnostic and molecular tests are aimed at both private and hospital analysis laboratories worldwide.

In immunodiagnostics, Diasorin offers the market proprietary-based platforms on the CLIA and ELISA technologies.

In molecular diagnostics, Diasorin offers proprietary platforms that cover the three phases of the testing process: extraction, amplification and detection.

== History ==
The origins of the company date back to 1968, when near on an initiative of Fiat and Montecatini, the "Sorin Biomedica" was founded by the "Società Ricerche Impianti Nucleari - Sorin". In 1997 American Standard acquired Sorin Biomedica, together with Immunonuclear Corporation (Incstar, Inc.). The two companies formed the Medical System Group of American Standard that later on came to include also Sienna Biotech, Inc Diasorin became an independent Italian group in 2000, through a management buyout operation led by Carlo Rosa and Gustavo Denegri.

The etymology of the name contains the acronym of Sorin, "Nuclear plant research company", the company established in the 1960s, and "Dia" which stands for Diagnostics. In 1997 Sorin decided to build upon the activities relating to in vitro diagnostics into a company that took on the name of Diasorin Vercelli.

== Acquisitions and partnerships ==
In 2002 Diasorin acquired BYC Sangtec and the rights to the Liaison platform. The commercial expansion led to the opening of new branches in Mexico, Israel, and China. The Liaison portfolio was enriched with products for new and clinical specialty areas. In the same year, tests previously developed with ELISA technology were converted to the most recent and automated CLIA.

On July 19, 2007, the Diasorin title debuted at Borsa Italiana Stock Exchange.

In 2014 the company obtained the approval of hepatitis and retrovirus tests in China; in the same year, Diasorin launched new tests to detect leukemias. Diasorin Group signed an agreement in 2015 with Beckman Coulter for the commercialization in China of Diasorin hepatitis and HIV tests. In 2016, Diasorin and Beckman Coulter signed an additional partnership, with the aim to provide customers in the U.S. the same hepatitis and HIV tests. The two companies are working together to submit the products to the Food and Drug administration (FDA) for approval and commercialization in the U.S. In this year, the group acquired of Focus Diagnostics’ business unit, enabling it to expand its activities in molecular diagnostics.

In 2017, a partnership with Qiagen offered an automated solution for detection of tuberculosis with QuantiFERON-TB Gold Plus available on the Liaison analyzers. That was also the year of the Siemens Healthineers ELISA business acquisition.

In October 2018 the Saluggia branch began a partnership with Meridian for the distribution of a Helicobacter pylori detection test in the United States and United Kingdom. The companies have put in place a framework under which they may work together on the development of new tests and products.

In 2019 the commercial launch of Liaison XS approval of latent tuberculosis test in the United States.

In 2020 Diasorin signed an exclusive license agreement with TTP for the automation of molecular diagnostic tests on a Point-of-Care platform.

In September 2020 Diasorin and MeMed started a strategic partnership for the development and commercialization of a diagnostic solution based on the patients' immune response that can differentiate between bacterial and viral infections.

In April 2021, in partnership with QIAGEN, Diasorin launched in countries accepting the CE Mark the LIAISON LymeDetect test for the early diagnosis of Lyme Borreliosis, based on the QuantiFERON technology.

On 14 July 2021 Diasorin announced the completion of the acquisition of Luminex Corporation.

== Recent developments ==
=== Diasorin's response to the Covid-19 pandemic ===
On 7 April 2020, Diasorin announced the development of a new IgG CLIA test to identify antibodies against SARS-CoV-2 antibody, test that allows to detect antibodies directed against the virus in patients' serum samples, identifying subjects who have developed an immune response to the virus, offering a tool for epidemiologic assessment of populations.

On 25 April 2020, Diasorin received Emergency Use Authorization from the U.S. Food and Drug Administration for a new serologic test for COVID-19.

On May 2, 2020, Diasorin received approval for the commercialization of the LIAISON SARS-CoV-2 S1 / S2 IgG test in Brazil from ANVISA, the Brazilian health regulatory agency, and on May 12, 2020, the same test obtained approval from Health Canada, the Canadian government department responsible for federal health policy. This latter officially issued approval made the Diasorin serological test the first to receive authorization in the country.

On June 30, Diasorin announced the launch of the new LIAISON SARS-CoV-2 IgM test, CE marked and made available in the United States through the validation notification submitted to the Food and Drug Administration (FDA), which was followed by the authorization request for emergency use, as required by the "Policy for Coronavirus Disease-2019 Tests During the Public Health Emergency (Revised)". Diasorin announced it obtained the Emergency Use Authorization by the FDA on October 1, 2020.

On September 7, 2020, Diasorin announced that it has received FDA Clearance for its Simplexa™ Flu A/B & RSV Direct Gen II kit. The molecular assay can be run alone or alongside the Simplexa COVID-19 Direct kit, allowing for differential diagnosis of SARS-CoV-2, influenza A (Flu A), influenza B (Flu B), and respiratory syncytial virus (RSV).

On September 16, 2020, Diasorin attained CE Marking for the addition of saliva specimens for use with the Simplexa™ COVID-19 Direct assay.

On October 1, 2020, Diasorin received U.S. FDA Emergency Use Authorization (EUA) for its LIAISON SARS-CoV-2 IgM test. The LIAISON SARS-CoV-2 IgM test will be available on the LIAISON XL platforms installed in the U.S. market, using chemiluminescence immunoassay (CLIA) technology for the qualitative determination of specific IgM antibodies to SARS-CoV-2 in human serum or plasma samples. The test identifies the presence of IgM antibodies in patients who have been infected with SARS-CoV-2, enabling the distinction between newly infected and past-infected patients.

On October 26, Diasorin announced the obtainment of the CE mark for the launch of the new Liaison Sars-Cov-2 Ag antigen test, capable of detecting COVID-19 on symptomatic patients and determining their viral load. The test received U.S. FDA Emergency Use Authorization (EUA) on March 29, 2020.

On January 11, 2021, Diasorin launched in countries accepting the CE Mark the LIAISON SARS-CoV-2 TrimericS IgG test. The test was developed using the full length SARS-CoV-2 Spike protein in its Trimeric form, which perfectly mimics the native conformation of the protein. The test is therefore able to detect the full variety of the natural immune response to the virus reducing the risk of false negative results. The test, originally available in countries accepting the CE Mark, received U.S. FDA Emergency Use Authorization (EUA) on May 20, 2021.

On April 6, 2021, Diasorin launched in countries accepting CE Mark a new Point-of-Care immunodiagnostic platform, the LIAISON IQ, developed in partnership with Lumos Diagnostics together with a first test to detect antibodies against SARS-CoV-2. On May 25, 2021, an additional test was made available on the LIAISON IQ platform, to detect the COVID-19 antigen in nasal and nasopharyngeal swabs. Both tests use lateral flow technology.

On May 21, 2021, Diasorin launched a molecular diagnostic test to easily detect the mutations associated with the most common variants of SARS-CoV-2.

== Technologies ==
The research team of about 200 people is dedicated to the development of solutions for specialized tests to support doctors and laboratory managers in the processing of diagnoses of even niche diseases. The technologies of immunodiagnostics and molecular diagnostics applied to the tests of Diasorin are based on automated technological platforms developed by partner companies based on specifications indicated by Diasorin. Such platforms are open to interconnection with the ones of other diagnostic operators.

=== Analysis kits ===
Diasorin tests are biochemical components that aim to determine the presence of a specific element (virus, hormone, etc.) in the sample taken from the patient. The two technologies used, immunodiagnostic and molecular diagnostic, identify the presence of the component sought—even in minimal quantities, to define its characteristics.

The areas of Diasorin's offer for analysis kits in the specialty immunodiagnostics sector are the following:

• Infectious diseases

• Gastrointestinal infections

• Bone and mineral metabolism

• Endocrinology

• Hypertension

• Oncology

• Onco-hematology

• Autoimmunity

In particular, in the field of molecular diagnostics, Diasorin has focused its research on the area of infectious diseases, with tests based on different matrices—including blood, cerebrospinal fluid, skin, and mucocutaneous swabs.

=== Immunodiagnostics Platforms ===
==== LIAISON XL ====
The LIAISON XL is the automated analyzer that integrates the menu of specialty diagnostic tests offered by the Group. The platform can be used both in stand-alone configuration and through the connection of the instrument to the Laboratory Automation Systems of the leading players on the market.

==== LIAISON XS ====
The LIAISON XS analyzer, currently available in European countries, is designed for analysis laboratories with low-medium throughput needs that can take advantage of this new platform for specific needs related to specialty tests.

== Geographical Presence ==
In 2019 Diasorin generated revenues (706.3 million euros) in Europe and Africa for 46.1%, in the United States and Canada for 29.1%, in Asia and Oceania for 19.0%, in America Latin for 6.3%. Sales concern CLIA tests for 65.7% (122 fully automated tests relating to infectious diseases, hepatitis and retroviruses, gastrointestinal infections, cardiac markers, bone metabolism, and endocrinological tests), for 14.2% ELISA tests (partially automated), for 8.5% molecular diagnostic tests, for 11.6% diagnostic equipment. The production plants are located in Saluggia and Gerenzano in Italy, Dietzenbach in Germany, Stillwater, Cypress in the US, and Dartford in the UK.

The marketing of the Group's products in the European, US, Mexican, Brazilian, Chinese, Australian, and Israeli markets is mainly managed by the commercial companies belonging to the Diasorin Group. In countries where the Group does not have a direct presence, an international network of over 200 independent distributors exists.

== Partnerships and Collaborations ==
Over time, Diasorin has entered into partnerships to develop joint business lines. These include partnerships with Qiagen, for the development of an automated solution for the diagnosis of latent tuberculosis and with Beckman Coulter, for the registration in the Chinese and US market of automated tests for the analysis of hepatitis and retroviruses.

== Shareholder base ==
Shareholder (2021)	Share %
Finde SS	43.95%
Rosa Carlo	0.08%
Even Chen Menachem	0.08%
T. Rowe Price Associates, Inc.	3.03%
Market	39.43%

== Financial data ==
Diasorin has been listed on the Italian Stock Exchange since 2007 and is in the FTSE Italy Mid Cap Index.

(in million Euros)	2007	2008	2009	2010	2011	2012	2013	2014	2015	2016	2017	2018	2019	2020
Sales and service revenues	206,3	244,6	304,1	404,5	440	433,7	434,8	443,7	449,1	569,3	637,4	669,2	706,3	881,3
Cost of sales	(73,8)	(84)	(90,4)	(119,8)	(126,1)	(136,4)	(135,1)	(145)	(157,2)	(180,1)	(205,5)	(214,4)	(217,6)	(278,4)
Gross profit	132,5	160,6	213,6	284,7	313,8	297,3	299,6	298,7	341,8	389,1	431,9	455,8	488,7	602,9
EBIT	47,5	70,7	106,4	145,5	163,3	140,2	134,6	129,8	152	172,6	184,4	204,5	217,9	324,2
Profit before taxes	44,1	59,8	103,7	144,9	158,2	137,4	129,3	128,1	150,1	168,1	178,7	204,4	216,3	321,4
Net result	26,3	37,4	70	90,4	99,6	87,6	83,1	84	100,5	112,6	139,8	158,1	175,7	248,3
EBITDA	61,5	85,6	123,6	167,1	190	169,5	163	160,2	184,9	217,3	237,9	255,4	276,8	385,3

== Management ==
Role	Name
Chairman	Gustavo Denegri
Chief Executive Officer	Carlo Rosa
Chief Commercial Officer	Chen Even
Senior Corporate VP e Chief Financial Officer	Piergiorgio Pedron
Senior Corporate VP Human Resources	Stefano Ronchi
Senior Corporate VP Industrial Operations	Ugo Gay
