= Technogym =

Italian company for gym equipment

Technogym SpA
- Traded as: BIT: TGYM; FTSE Italia Mid Cap
- Industry: Retail
- Founded: 1983; 43 years ago
- Founder: Nerio Alessandri
- Headquarters: Cesena, Italy
- Key people: Nerio Alessandri (president and founder)
- Products: Fitness equipment
- Revenue: ▲€509 million (2020)
- Number of employees: 2300 (2020)
- Website: www.technogym.com

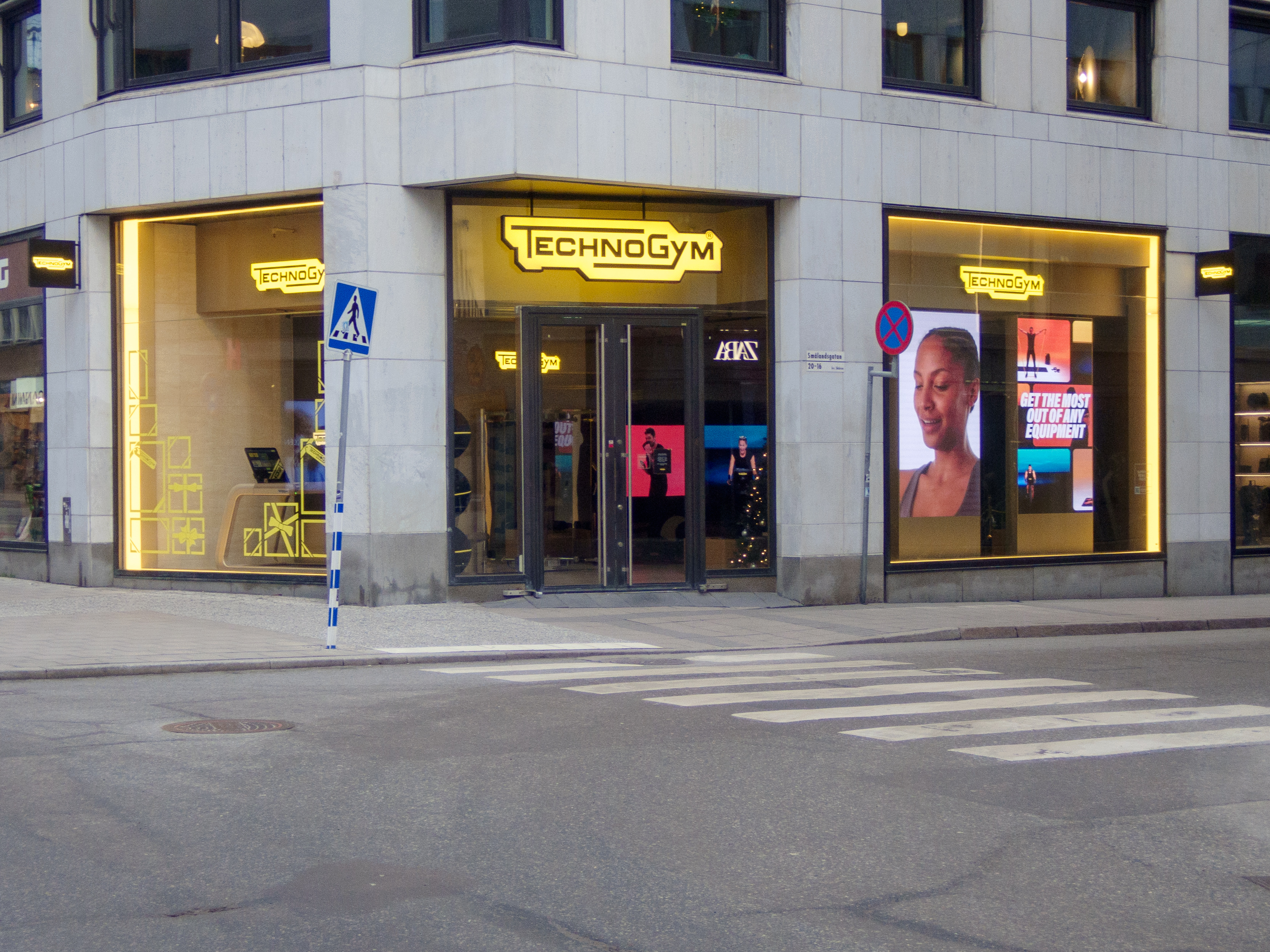
A Technogym store in Stockholm

Technogym is an Italian manufacturer of sports and leisure equipment based in Cesena. It was founded in 1983 by Nerio Alessandri. It has around 55,000 installations worldwide, in 35,000 wellness centres and 20,000 private homes. The company employs 2,000 people in 14 branches in Europe, the United States, Asia, the Middle East, Australia and South America. It exports 90% of its turnover to 100 countries.

Technogym has been the exclusive and official supplier for the athletes' training centres in nine editions of the Olympic Games: from the Sydney Olympic Games to the Paris 2024 Olympics.

== History ==
Entrepreneur Nerio Alessandri in the early 1980s began building a prototype of an exercise machine in the garage of his home in Cesena. He used a public telephone booth because he had no telephone at home, and got help from his brother Pierluigi Alessandri, from his then girlfriend and now wife Stefania, and from friends and neighbours who became his first collaborators. He left his job as a designer at a company in Cesena that manufactured automatic machines for packaging fruit, and rented a warehouse in Gambettola. In 1985, Technogym launched its first complete strength training line, and in 1986 it presented Unica, a home training multistation.

In 1990, the company added its first cardiovascular training line. In 1992, Technogym defined its wellness concept as "a lifestyle based on regular physical activity, a balanced diet and a positive attitude", adding the slogan "The Wellness Company" to the company logo. The wellness concept was proposed as an alternative to the American concept of fitness. In 1996 the company introduced Wellness System, the first software to manage people's training programs at the gym.

In 2000 it launched the Selection line, and in 2002 it launched Excite, the first cardiovascular training line with an integrated TV screen.

The company has been an official supplier for numerous Olympic Games.

In 2012, the company introduced MyWellness Cloud, the evolution of the Wellness System that allows users to access their own personalized workout program on Technogym connected equipment, wherever they are, in the gym, in hotels, in medical centres, at home or outdoors through a dedicated app.

In July 2014, Technogym partnered with industrial designer Antonio Citterio to create a sleek line of home gym equipment. The Personal Line integrates tablet-style console called VISIOWEB that runs on an Android platform.

In August 2014, the 2016 Summer Olympics in Rio announced it was choosing Technogym as an exclusive supplier.

On 29 September 2012, the new Technogym Village was officially inaugurated in Cesena, with the presence of the President of the Italian Republic Giorgio Napolitano, the ministers Corrado Passera, Piero Gnudi and Renato Balduzzi, and the former President of the United States Bill Clinton. The new headquarters was designed by architect Antonio Citterio.

In 2019, Technogym enhanced its focus on digital, introducing Technogym Bike, its first indoor bike that offers indoor-cycling classes live and on-demand run by trainers from fitness studios around the world.

After selling 6.96% of the capital in April 2019, in February 2020, Alessandri's Wellness Holding sold almost 5% of Technogym in an accelerated placement, cashing in $114 million. Wellness thus dropped to 39.8% of the capital of the Romagna giant, equal to 56.9% of the voting rights.

== Partnerships ==
=== Olympics ===
Technogym was appointed official supplier to the Paris 2024 Olympics for the 9th time, after Sydney 2000, Athens 2004, Turin 2006, Beijing 2008, London 2012, Rio de Janeiro 2016, Tokyo 2020 and Pyeongchang 2018.

=== Football ===
The football teams Juventus FC, Milan AC, and Inter FC have chosen Technogym as a partner for the athletic preparation of their players, as well as the F1 teams Ferrari and McLaren.

=== Other sports ===
In tennis, Technogym has been chosen as supplier by Rafael Nadal and Jannik Sinner. It is also the supplier to basketball teams Olimpia Milano and Virtus Bologna. In sailing, Technogym is a partner of Luna Rossa, and in golf it is an official partner of the Professional Golfers Association, the organization that manages the main professional golf tours in the United States. Technogym was a sponsor of the Benetton Formula 1 team from 1993 to 1997.

== Design awards ==
Technogym has received many awards for the design of its products, including:

- 3 Compasso d'Oro Awards
- 12 ADI Awards
- 12 Red Dot Design Awards
- 3 International Design Excellence Awards
- 4 iF Awards

== See also ==
- List of Italian companies
