= Technoprobe =

Italian semiconductor equipment manufacturer

- Company type: Società per azioni
- Traded as: BIT: TPRO; FTSE Italia Mid Cap
- Industry: Semiconductors
- Founded: 1996; 30 years ago in Merate, Italy
- Founder: Giuseppe Crippa
- Headquarters: Cernusco Lombardone, Italy
- Area served: Worldwide
- Key people: Stefano Felici (CEO)
- Products: Probe cards
- Revenue: ▲€550 million (2022)
- Number of employees: 2700
- Website: technoprobe.com

Technoprobe is a designer and manufacturer of probe cards and measurement technologies for integrated circuits headquartered in Italy.

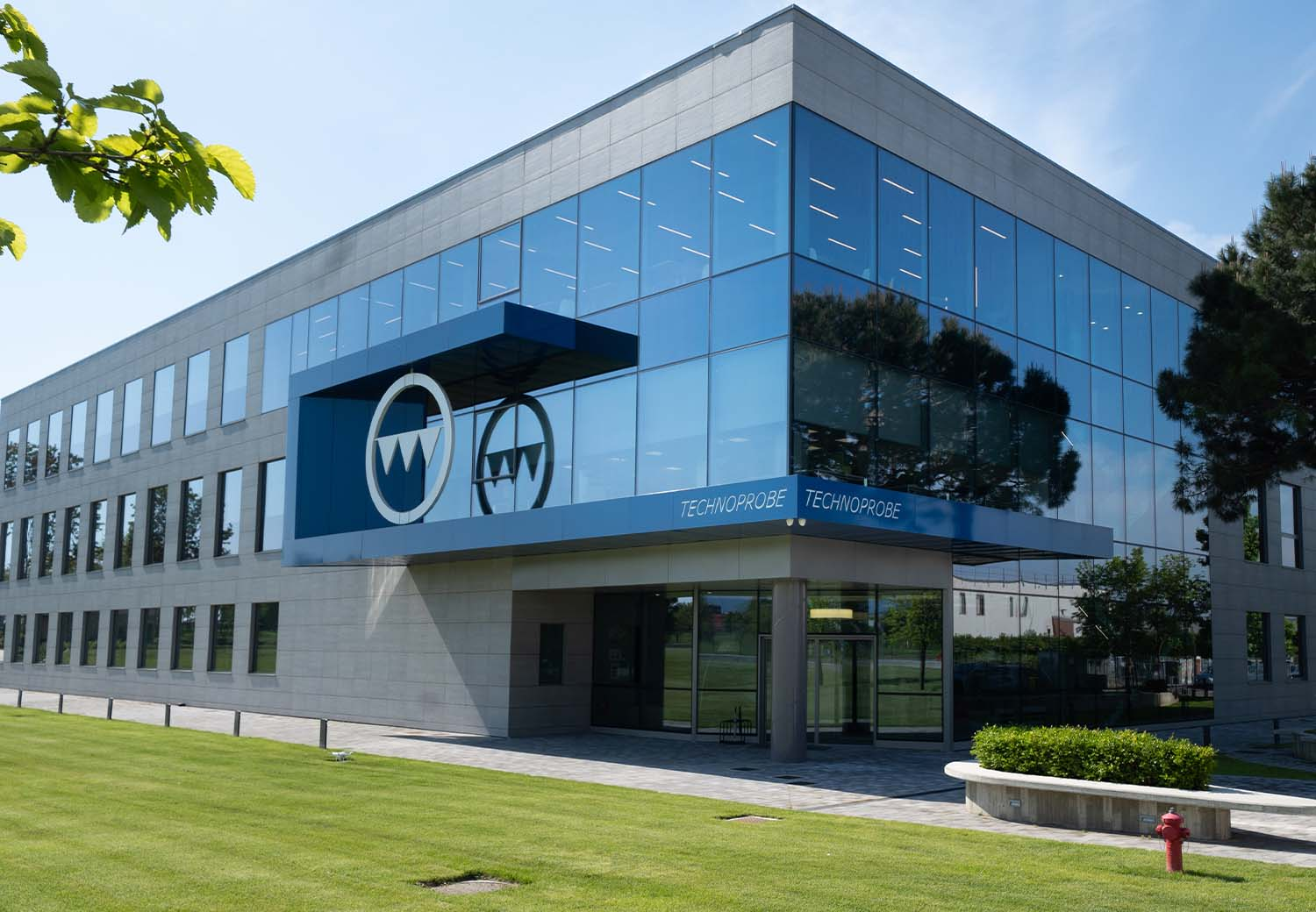
Technoprobe Headquarters

== History ==
Technoprobe was founded in Merate near Milan in 1996 by Giuseppe Crippa, who had developed a new and more rapid method to manufacture probe cards.

In 2007, Technoprobe marketed the first probe card with vertical MEMS.

By 2017, it was the world's third largest manufacturer of probe cards, and by 2020, it was second largest.

It became a public company in 2022, with shares available for trading at Milan's stock exchange.

In 2023, Technoprobe acquired Harbor Electronics, a company based in Santa Clara, California. Teradyne acquired a 10% equity stake and sold its device interface solutions division to Technoprobe.
