= Saluggia =

- Comune
- Comune di Saluggia
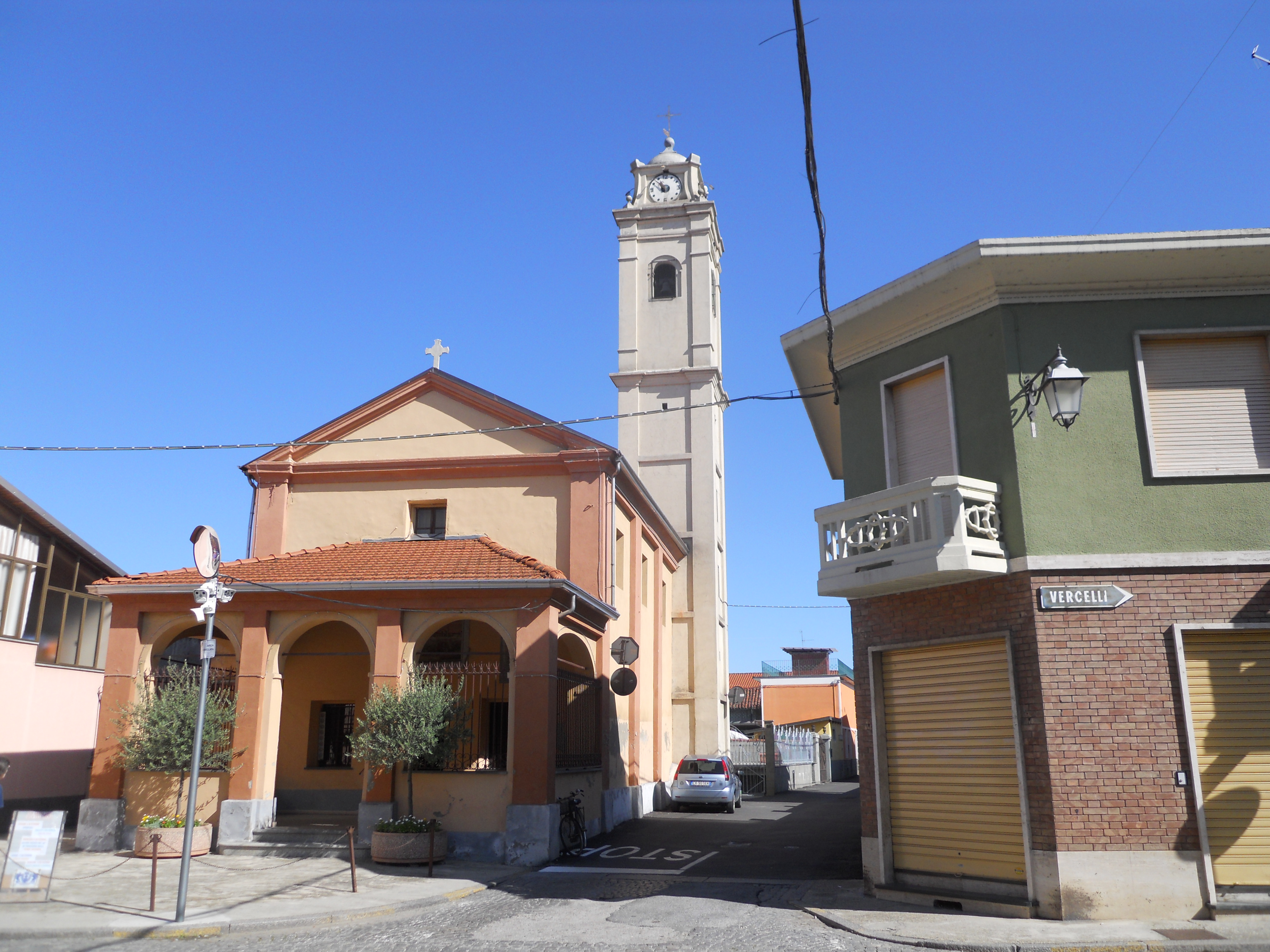
- Church of San Bonaventura

- Coat of arms

- Location within Italy Location within Piedmont
- Coordinates: 45°14′N 8°1′E
- Country: Italy
- Region: Piedmont
- Province: Vercelli (VC)
- Frazioni: Sant'Antonino di Saluggia

Government
  - Mayor: Firmino Barberis

Area
  - Total: 31.7 km^{2} (12.2 sq mi)
- Elevation: 194 m (636 ft)

Population (Dec. 2004)
  - Total: 4,128
  - Density: 130/km^{2} (337/sq mi)
- Demonym: Saluggesi
- Time zone: UTC+1 (CET)
  - Summer (DST): UTC+2 (CEST)
- Postal code: 13040
- Dialing code: 0161
- Patron saint: St. Gratus
- Saint day: 6 September
- Website: Official website

Saluggia (Salugia in Piedmontese) is a comune (municipality) in the Province of Vercelli in the Italian region Piedmont, located about 30 kilometres (19 mi) northeast of Turin and about 35 kilometres (22 mi) southwest of Vercelli, near the Dora Baltea river.

It is known in Italy and abroad for the production of beans and for having a storage site for nuclear wastes.

== Twin towns ==
- Russi, Italy
