= Susan Carol Holland =

Italian-British businesswoman (born 1956)

- Born: 27 May 1956
- Education: Keele University
- Title: Chairman, Amplifon
- Parent: Algernon Charles Holland

Susan Carol Holland (born 27 May 1956) is an Italian-British billionaire businesswoman, and the chairman of Amplifon, an Italian hearing aid retailer founded by in Milan in 1950 by her father Algernon Charles Holland.

== Early life ==
Holland earned a bachelor's degree in psychology and sociology from Keele University, followed by a diploma in Logopaedia from the Universita degli Studi di Milano.

== Career ==
From 1982, she worked as a speech therapist in Milan.

In 1988, she became a director of Amplifon SpA, and in 1993, non-executive vice-chair.

She owns 44.9% of Amplifon through her family's holding company.

In August 2018, Bloomberg estimated her net worth at US$2.3 billion.
