= ION Group =

Financial data and software company

- Trade name: ION
- Type: Private
- Industry: Financial services Technology
- Founded: 1999; 27 years ago
- Founder: Andrea Pignataro
- Headquarters: London, United Kingdom
- Subsidiaries: Acuris; Allegro; Dealogic; Fidessa
- Website: www.iongroup.com

ION Group, also known as Ion and Ion Investment Group, is a financial data and software company headquartered in London. The company has expanded rapidly through a series of acquisitions. The Financial Times has compared it to Bloomberg L.P., although it has a low profile.

== Background ==
After studying at the University of Bologna, Andrea Pignataro later received a doctorate in mathematics from Imperial College London. He then worked as a bond trader in London. While working at Salomon Brothers, Pignataro led a joint venture with Pisa-based software firm List Holdings. The business would become Ion Trading UK, the start of ION. In 1999, Pignataro left Salomon Brothers in London to establish ION as an independent company. Pignataro also founded an investment firm with fellow traders after leaving Salomon Brothers but by the early 2000s, he was fully focused on Ion.

In June 2004, TA Associates made its initial investment in Ion for $44 million. It would make additional investments later for a cumulative sum of $200 million. Ion has expanded through a series of acquisitions, and between 2005 and 2019, Ion had acquired 20 companies reaching an enterprise value of £7 billion in November 2019. On 31 May 2016 The Carlyle Group announced it would acquire a minority interest in Ion for $400 million. The following month, it was reported that Ion would buy out TA Associates' stake to fund its growth. TA Associates reportedly made almost four times its investment from the sale of its stake in Ion.

In November 2017, Euromoney sold its 15.5% stake in Dealogic to Ion for $135 million which gave Ion a controlling stake. In April 2018, Ion acquired Fidessa for £1.5 billion by outbidding Temenos AG. The deal came just hours before the deadline set by The Takeover Panel. The deal was to enable Ion to enter the equities and derivatives markets. Ion stated it had been provided with only "limited due diligence access" with regards to Fidessa and would carry out a deeper review once the deal was completed. In April 2019, Ion acquired Allegro Development Corporation from Vector Capital and Cerium Technology. In May 2019, Ion acquired Acuris from BC Partners for £1.35 billion to expand its product offerings for capital markets.

There were talks of a plan to combine Ion with Nasdaq, Inc. in 2019. However they ended without an agreement because of concerns about whether the two would fit together. Following this and another failed bid for a financial services software business in Switzerland, Pignataro decided to consolidate control of Ion by taking out loans to buy out Carlyle's stake. After this Ion started investing in various Italian finance related companies such as Cedacri and Cerved. In 2020, Ion acquired Broadway Technology but the Competition and Markets Authority blocked Ion from buying the fixed income business of Broadway Technology due to competition concerns. Eventually the Broadway Technology deal proceeded with Bloomberg L.P acquiring the fixed income business separately.

In June 2021, Ion acquired DASH Financial Technologies, a U.S. options technology and execution provider, from private equity firm Flexpoint Ford. In September 2021, Ion acquired Clarus Financial Technology, a derivatives analytics provider. On 1 February 2023, LockBit attacked Ion's derivative platform with a ransomware attack which disrupted clients such as financial institutions who were unable to process their transactions. Upwards of 40 different companies experienced slowed operations and had to resort to manual processes. The Commodity Futures Trading Commission delayed publication of weekly trading statistics as clients were not able to submit data reports in time. A few days later, LockBit claimed a ransom had been paid although no further details were provided. The week following the attack, Ion began to bring its clients back online. In July 2024, ION, through its subsidiary X3 Group, acquired Italian asset manager Prelios S.p.A. for €1.35 billion. As of August 2024, Ion has never sold a business since its founding.

== Debt structure concerns ==
In recent times, Ion avoids using public markets for funding and instead relies on private debt to finance its acquisitions. Lenders who had previously loaned money to Ion without issues were now cautious of the amount of debt that Ion has acquired. Ion had to resort to private debt to fund the Acuris acquisition after failing twice to come to an agreement in the syndicated loan market earlier during that year. As of November 2019, it was reported that Ion had more than $6 billion worth of debt.

HPS Investment Partners plays a significant role in lending private debt to Ion. As of January 2024, Ion has taken on $3 billion worth of private debt with HPS providing most of them. The loans were raised by different holding companies that are above Ion. Interest costs of private debt have increased an average of 10% per year. Ion has used dividends from its operating companies to cover the cost of those borrowings. Other lenders include the private debt division of Goldman Sachs and Credit Suisse.

To support high levels of debt, Ion implemented significant cost-cutting measures. Such measures have left many employees of acquired companies unhappy. Questions have been raised on whether quality can be maintained after the loss of experienced employees. For example, after Fidessa was acquired, Ion reduced its 3,300 strong workforce by 15-20% to make about $50 million in annual savings. In May 2019, Ion's lenders refused to back a plan for a $2 billion debt deal (with Ion taking out $250 million dividends) that would have rolled together Wall Street Systems, Openlink and TriplePoint into a new company called Ion Corporates. The aborted deal was a huge blow to UBS which would have earned tens of millions in fees as the sole financial advisor for most of Ion's deals. In September 2019, Moody's downgraded Ion Trading, the vehicle that owns Fidessa, into junk status because "the company had paid substantial dividends" instead of paying down debt.

In July 2023, the Meloni government used golden powers to condemn Cedacri after a $275 million bond sale in May 2023. This effectively stopped it and other Italian Ion units from raising debt to pay dividends to Ion holdings companies. An Italian court upheld the decision in June 2024. In August 2023, Ion announced its bid to acquire Italian Asset Management firm Prelios from Davidson Kempner Capital Management. At that point, Ion was considered to play a crucial role in Italy's financial industry. The Italian government scrutinized Ion and the deal as Ion planned to use Prelios shares as a guarantee to lenders and merge it with the acquiring holding company. The government was concerned that if Ion were unable to make payments on Prelios’ debt, there would be repercussions for the broader Italian financial system. Ion pushed back against the government's investigation. After month of back and forth negotiations, the government cleared the deal after imposing conditions on Ion which have not been made public. In July 2024, Ion completed the acquisition for €1.35 billion. S&P has long assessed Ion as a private equity company as it uses similar strategies like one. However, in 2023, it changed its view since Ion has an "infinite investment horizon". It also noted that Ion never had a default in its history so far.

== Corporate affairs ==
Ion has been described as a discreet company. This comes in part due to Pignataro's management style, where information is tightly controlled among a close circle of fewer than ten advisers. Pignataro exerts tight control on Ion and there is key man risk for Ion which places heavy reliance on Pignataro and the advisers. Larger rivals such as Bloomberg L.P., FIS, and Intercontinental Exchange compete in parts of ION's businesses but none directly rivals Ion in all of its businesses, where it mostly competes with niche software companies.

Pignataro himself is very private with limited information on him being available; however, Bloomberg News states he is the most powerful figure in Italian Finance and is likely one of the richest people in Italy although due to the complex debt structures of the business, it is difficult to estimate his net worth. In 2025, Forbes put Pignataro as the second richest person in Italy with a net worth of $36.5 billion.
