= Giorgio Del Vecchio =

Italian legal philosopher (1878–1970)

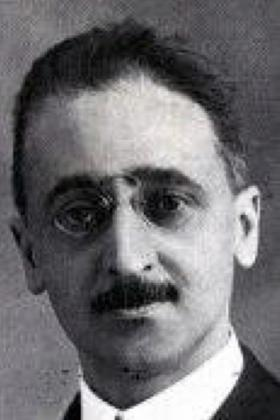
- Born: 26 August 1878; Bologna, Italy
- Died: 28 November 1970 (aged 92); Genoa, Italy

Philosophical work
- Era: 20th-century philosophy
- Region: Western philosophy
- Main interests: Ethics, legal philosophy, political philosophy

Giorgio Del Vecchio (26 August 1878 – 28 November 1970) was a prominent Italian legal philosopher of the early 20th century. Among others, he influenced the theories of Norberto Bobbio. He is famous for his book Justice.

== Biography ==
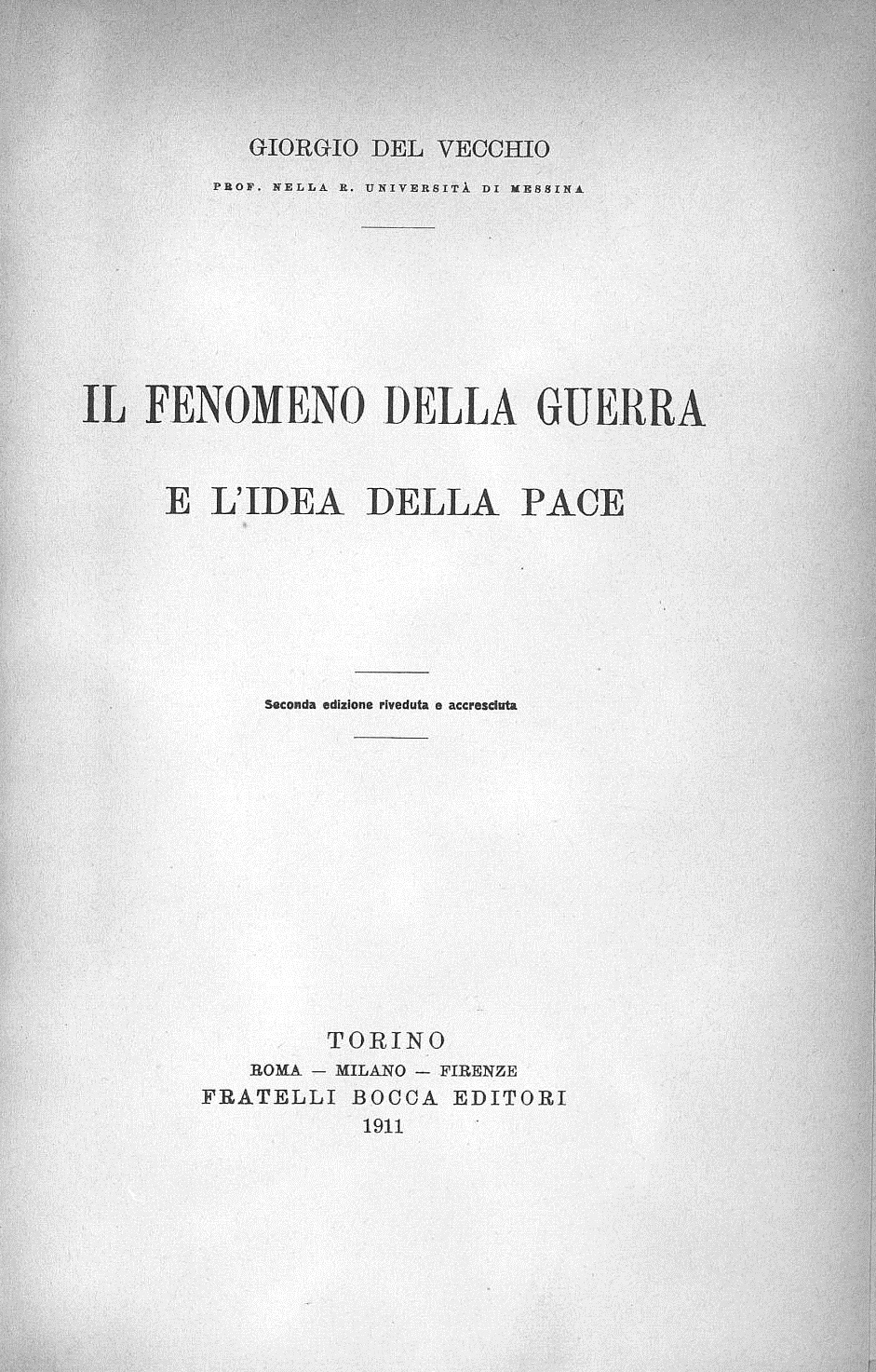
Il fenomeno della guerra e l'idea della pace, 1911

Son of Julius Saviour, Giorgio Del Vecchio was professor of philosophy of law at the University of Ferrara (1904), Sassari (1906), Messina (1909), Bologna (1911) and Rome from 1920 to 1953. He became Rector of the University of Rome from 1925 to 1927. He initially adhered to Fascism like many philosophers of law in Italy (though he removed himself from fascist ideology early on). He lost his professorship twice and for opposite reasons: in 1938 at the hands of fascists because he was a Jew, and in 1944 at the hands of anti-fascists because he was accused of sympathizing with fascism early on in his career.

Reinstated in teaching during the Second World War, he worked with the Century of Italy and the magazine Free Pages (publication directed by Vito Panucci). Along with Nino Tripodi, Gioacchino Volpe, Alberto Asquini, Roberto Cantalupo, Ernesto De Marzio and Emilio Betti, he was part of the organizing committee of INSPE, an Institute of research which in the fifties and sixties was opposed to Marxist culture, promoting international conferences and publications. He was the founder and director of the International Journal of Philosophy of Law.

He is considered among the major interpreters of Italian Neo-Kantism. Giorgio Del Vecchio, as did his German colleagues, criticized philosophical positivism, stating that the concept of law can not be derived from the observation of legal phenomena.

In this regard, his beliefs concurred with a dispute that was taking place in Germany between philosophy, sociology and general theory of law, which looked to redefine "philosophy of law"—to which Del Vecchio attributed three tasks:

- logic task: to construct the concept of law;
- phenomenological task: consisting of the study of law as a social phenomenon;
- ontological task: which examines the nature of justice or "the essence of law as it ought to be".

Del Vecchio's books are used as references and textbooks in many colleges and universities.

== Works ==
- The Legal Sense (1902)
- The Philosophical Presuppositions of the Concept of Law (1905)
- The Concept of Law (1906)
- Il concetto della natura e il principio del diritto ("The Concept of Nature and the Principle of Law", 1908)
  - Il concetto della natura e il principio del diritto (in Italian) (2 ed.). Bologna: Zanichelli. 1922.
- Il fenomeno della guerra e l'idea della pace (in Italian). Torino: Fratelli Bocca. 1911.
- Primitive and ancient legal institutions (1915)
- On General Principles of Law (1921)
- Jurisprudence (1922–23, 4 ed. 1951)
- Lessons Philosophy of Law (1930, 13 ed. 1957)
- The Crisis of the Science of Law (1934)
- History of the Philosophy of Right (1950)
- Mutability and Eternity of Law (1954)
- Studies on the Right (2 vols., 1958)
- Parerga (3 vols., 1961–67)
