= Alessandro Rosano =

Italian businessman

Alessandro Rosano is an Italian billionaire businessman who founded Hey Dude. He is based in Hong Kong.

== Biography ==
Born and raised in Tuscany, Rosano studied foreign trade in Pistoia from 1982 to 1987.

During his early career, Rosano worked on Fratelli Diversi, a shoe distributor that adhered to ethical business practices and engaged in charitable activities. He also co-founded WeWood, a wooden watch company, and introduced wooden clogs with spring-loaded heels under the Baldo brand; these projects achieved limited commercial success.

In 2008, following a trip to China, Rosano identified an opportunity to produce footwear that combined the comfort of slippers with contemporary design. He named it as "Hey Dude" to evoke a casual, American style, though it was pronounced according to Italian phonetics. Hey Dude's shoes were completed in Italy, while production took place in China.

In 2021, Crocs acquired Hey Dude. Following the acquisition, Rosano shifted his focus to managing investments and philanthropic activities through a family office.
