= Delfin (holding company) =

Italian investment holding company

Delfin S.à r.l.
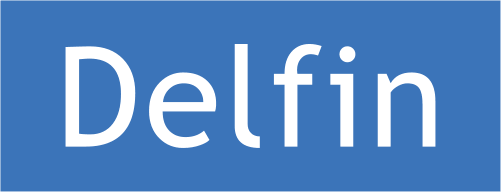
- Industry: Holding company
- Founded: 6 July 2006
- Founder: Leonardo Del Vecchio
- Headquarters: 7, Rue de la Chapelle, L-1325 Luxembourg, Luxembourg
- Key people: Francesco Milleri (Chairman); Romolo Bardin (CEO); Nicoletta Zampillo; Claudio Del Vecchio; Leonardo Maria Del Vecchio; Marisa Del Vecchio; Paola Del Vecchio; Luca Del Vecchio; Clemente Del Vecchio; Rocco Basilico
- Total assets: Approx. US$55 billion (2025 est.)
- Owner: Del Vecchio Family
- Subsidiaries: EssilorLuxottica – controlling stake (32% of shares, 31% voting rights); Monte dei Paschi di Siena – major shareholder (17.5%); Assicurazioni Generali – significant shareholder (10%); UniCredit – minority stake (2.7%); Covivio – major shareholder (28%)

Delfin S.à r.l. is a Luxembourg-based investment holding company controlled by the Del Vecchio family and founded by Leonardo Del Vecchio in 2006. It is the vehicle for managing the group’s industrial, financial, and real estate holdings, separating ownership from operational management.

== History ==
Delfin traces its origins to an earlier financial entity, Leonardo Finanziaria, established in 1990 to manage proceeds from Luxottica’s listing on the New York Stock Exchange, estimated at around US$80 million. Between 2004 and 2006, Leonardo Del Vecchio reorganized his investments under the Luxembourg-based Delfin S.à r.l. with the goal of consolidating the family’s assets and entrusting management to professional executives.

Initially controlling approximately 68% of Luxottica, Delfin became the reference shareholder of EssilorLuxottica following the 2017 merger with Essilor International, holding around 32% of shares and 31% of voting rights.

== Succession and family structure ==
Upon Leonardo Del Vecchio’s death on 27 June 2022 in Milan, his will provided for an equal division of Delfin S.à r.l. — the family holding that owns all the equity interests and liquidity of the Del Vecchio family — among his wife and children. According to an official statement by Delfin, each heir received a 12.5% stake in the company.

The heirs are: Nicoletta Zampillo Del Vecchio (spouse), Claudio Del Vecchio, Marisa Del Vecchio, Paola Del Vecchio, Leonardo Maria Del Vecchio, Luca Del Vecchio, Clemente Del Vecchio, and Rocco Basilico, the son of Nicoletta Zampillo from her previous marriage to Paolo Basilico.

Del Vecchio did not designate a successor as Chairman of Delfin. In accordance with the company’s bylaws, the board of directors was empowered to decide whether to appoint a new chairman. In 2023 the Board elected Francesco Milleri as Chairman of Delfin S.à r.l., ensuring strategic continuity with the founder’s vision.

As of 2025, Delfin’s Board includes Chairman Francesco Milleri, CEO Romolo Bardin, notary Mario Notari, Aloyse May, and Giovanni Giallombardo.

At the time of Del Vecchio’s death, the total assets of the holding were estimated at over €30 billion.

== Governance ==
Since 2022, Delfin has been chaired by Francesco Milleri, President and CEO of EssilorLuxottica, while Romolo Bardin is Chief Executive Officer. The governance model reflects Leonardo Del Vecchio’s intention to maintain family ownership while delegating executive management.

== Investments ==
As of 2025, Delfin S.à r.l. holds stakes across several sectors:

- Industry and eyewear: Former control of Luxottica (≈68%) and, since 2017, controlling shareholder of EssilorLuxottica (32% of shares, 31% voting rights).
- Finance: Major stakes in MPS (17.5%), Assicurazioni Generali (10%), and UniCredit (2.7%).
- Real estate: Major shareholder in Covivio (≈28%).

=== Public companies ===
Company	Issued capital	Voting rights
(France) (Italy) EssilorLuxottica	32,26 %	%
(Italy) Mediobanca	19,74 %	%
(Italy) Banca Monte dei Paschi di Siena	17.53 %	%
(Italy) Assicurazioni Generali	10.053%	%
(France) Covivio	28,03%	%
(Luxembourg) Luxair	13%	%
(Italy) Avio	3.68%	%
(Italy) Unicredit	2.7%	%

== Financial data ==
In 2024, Delfin reported net profits of €1.393 billion, more than doubling the previous year’s result (+105%). Dividend revenues totaled over €1.144 billion, a 29% increase from 2023. The total value of assets owned exceeded €55 billion as of 2025, up from approximately €45 billion in 2024 (+31% year-on-year).

== See also ==
- List of the largest family businesses
