= Sergio Stevanato =

Italian businessman

Sergio Stevanato (born 20 March 1943 in Venice-Italy), is an Italian businessman. He is President of Stevanato Group.

== History ==
Sergio Stevanato was born in Venice - Italy in 1943 and graduated in law in 1969 at Ferrara University. He started to dedicate himself to the glass industry when he was young, spending his summer time in the company founded by his father in 1949 in Venice (moved subsequently to Piombino Dese-Italy). After his graduation he took the direction of Stevanato Group (founded by his father Giovanni Stevanato in 1949) and now he is President of the company. In 2007 he was appointed “Cavaliere del Lavoro” by the President of the Italian Republic Giorgio Napolitano.

== Other ==
Sergio Stevanato is President of SFEM, a financial company active in estates and private equity sector. He is owner of Tenuta Stella, a winery in the Friuli-Venezia Giulia region, Italy.

== Acknowledgements ==
28 March 2007: Cavaliere del Lavoro
