= Banca Finnat =

Bank in Italy

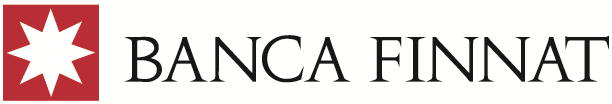
- Type: Public
- Traded as: BIT: BFE
- Industry: Banking; Financial services
- Founded: 1898
- Headquarters: Palazzo Altieri, Piazza del Gesù, 49 - 00186 Rome
- Key people: Marco Tofanelli - Chairman; Arturo Nattino - CEO
- Net income: 13,2 Million € (2023)
- Website: www.bancafinnat.it

Banca Finnat Banca Finnat Euramerica is a bank founded in 1898 by the Nattino family, from whom the bank also takes its name. First a financial company, then a commission agent for the Stock Exchange and then a SIM, in 1998 it became a bank.

== Organization ==
Banca Finnat's main areas of operation are asset management and financial advice for private and corporate clients, fiduciary activities, services for institutional investors, Advisory & Corporate Finance and the management of real estate funds through its subsidiary Investire SGR S.p.A.^{.} Through Investire SGR S.p.A., a real estate fund management company, Banca Finnat manages €7 billion in diversified assets across various products and markets.

== Some history ==
The origins and history of Banca Finnat date back to 1898, when Pietro Nattino opened a financial business, which has been developed by the successive generations of the family to the present day. In 1961, Euramerica Finanziaria Internazionale was established following a partnership with Morgan Group. In 1991, after the enactment of the new Italian law on stockbroking companies, both Finnat and Euramerica were registered as Società di intermediazione mobiliare or SIMs. In 1998, the company became a bank, specialising in investment services for institutional clients, businesses and individuals.

In March 2018 Banca Finnat decided to exit the London Stock Exchange, of which it had been a shareholder since 2007 following the merger of the London Stock Exchange with Borsa Spa: it was the last Italian banking partner. In 2018 Flavia Mazzarella was appointed president, until 2021 when she was replaced by the new president: Marco Tofanelli. After trying to acquire Cesare Ponti bank to grow in northern Italy, it updated the Business Plan until 2024 aiming to grow the subsidiary Investire Sgr Spa, the real estate asset management company of the Group.

In August 2022, Banca Finnat acquired a minority stake (9.9%) in Hedge Invest, an investment company led by Alessandra Manuli, with the possibility of acquiring another 15% stake in three years' time.

Since 2022, Banca Finnat is no longer listed on the Stock Exchange, the Roman institution leaves Piazza Affari after 83 years.

== Headquarters and major offices ==
Palazzo Altieri, the headquarters of Banca Finnat, was designed halfway through the 17th century by the architect Antonio De' Rossi, and subsequently decorated by several artists on the request of Pope Clement X. At the end of the 18th century, the building became an important monument to the Roman and International Neoclassicism. It is still regarded today as a fine example of the Baroque architectural and artistic style. In the entrance hall of the Bank the frescoed ceiling portrays the "Apotheosis of Romulus", a piece by Domenico Maria Canuti.

The Group also has offices in Rome, Milan, Novi Ligure and Lugano

== Group subsidiaries ==
- Finnat Fiduciaria S.p.A. - (100%)
- Finnat Gestioni S.A. - (70%)
- Natam S.A. - (100%)
- Investire SGR S.p.A. - (59,15%)
- Imprebanca S.p.A - (20%)

== Shareholders ==
The Shareholders' Base is divided as follows:

- Nattino Holding S.R.L.: 89,57%
- Finnat Fiduciaria S.P.A.: 4,91%
- G.L. Investimenti S.R.L.: 2,62%
- H.P.A. S.R.L: 1,55%
- Salivetto Daniela: 1,36%
