= Stevanato Group =

Italian multinational company

Stevanato Group SpA
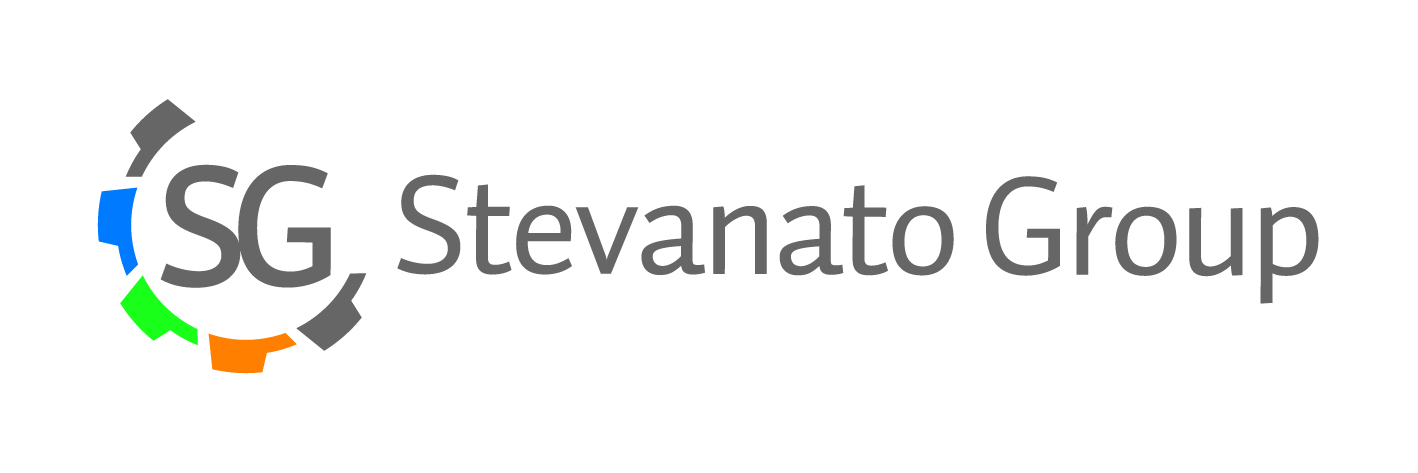
- Type: Public company
- Traded as: NYSE: STVN
- Industry: Packaging
- Founded: 1949; 77 years ago in Venice
- Founder: Giovanni Stevanato
- Headquarters: Piombino Dese, Italy
- Area served: Worldwide
- Key people: Sergio Stevanato (Chairman of the Board Emeritus), Franco Stevanato (Executive Chairman of the Board of Directors), Marco Stevanato (Vice-Chairman)
- Products: Glass primary packaging for pharmaceutical use (ampoules, vials, cartridges and syringes, both in bulk and ready-to-fill EZ-fill format); glass tube forming machines and visual inspection, assembly and packaging machines
- Revenue: ▲€1.19 billion (2025)
- Net income: ▲€140 million (2025)
- Number of employees: 4,200 (2020)
- Website: stevanatogroup.com

Stevanato Group is an Italian multinational company headquartered in Piombino Dese, Padua – Italy. Founded in 1949, it is also active in the glass tube forming technology and inspection systems sector.

The Group is the first worldwide producer of insulin cartridges for diabetes treatment and design and production of machinery for glass tubing converting.

== History ==
Nuova Ompi, the first company of the Group, was founded in Venice in 1949 by Giovanni Stevanato, father of the actual president Sergio Stevanato. In 1959 the company moved to its current location: Piombino Dese, Padua – Italy.

A second company (SPAMI) was established in 1971, specialized in the design and construction of high-speed precision machines and complete lines for the production and control of glass tube containers for pharmaceutical use. In 1993 Stevanato Group purchased Alfamatic (Latina, Italy) and with the acquisition of Medical Glass (Bratislava) in 2005, the Group opened to the internationalization.

In 2007 the Group acquired Optrel (Vicenza), an Italian company specialized in the design and the construction of inspection machines for the pharmaceutical industry. In addition, Nuova Ompi launched the EZ-fill brand, starting with the production of sterile syringes. In 2008 a new production plant called "Ompi North America" was built in Monterrey, Mexico.

Two years later the EZ-fill concept was extended to vials and cartridges.

In 2012 the Group doubled the Monterrey plant started the construction of a new plant in China (Zhangjiagang - Shanghai area).

In 2013 the Group acquired InnoScan, a Danish manufacturer of inspection machines for the pharmaceutical industry. In 2016 the Group acquired the Danish company SVM Automatik specialized in assembly, packaging and serialization solutions for the pharmaceutical industry and the operative units of Balda Group, specialized in high quality and high precision plastic solutions for diagnostic, pharmaceutical and medical device applications. In 2017 the third greenfield - Ompi do Brasil - plant was opened in Sete Lagoas.

== Divisions ==
Stevanato Group comprises two operational divisions: Pharmaceutical Systems with Ompi specialized in glass primary packaging and Balda, focused on specialty plastics and delivery devices; Engineering Systems with Spami, Optrel, InnoScan and SVM, specialized in glass processing, inspection systems, assembly, and packaging solutions.

=== Pharmaceutical Systems Division ===
With locations throughout the world (Italy, Slovakia, Germany, Mexico, USA, China, Brazil), the Pharmaceutical Systems Division produces traditional products such as vials, ampoules, and also strong growth products such as syringes and cartridges for autoinjection systems. With the acquisition of the operative units of Balda, the division is also now specialized in plastic solutions, developed and manufactured to meet customers’ specific needs. Balda's healthcare segment is active in diagnostic, pharmaceutical and medical device applications.

=== Engineering Systems Division ===
The Engineering Systems Division consists of SPAMI (with its brand Optrel), InnoScan and SVM Automatik. Spami designs and manufactures machinery for glass tubing converting for the production of vials, cartridges, syringes, ampoules and special devices. Optrel and InnoScan refer to the visual inspection area focused on the inspection machines market for the pharmaceutical industry. SVM Automatik is a company specialized in assembly, packaging and serialization solutions for the pharmaceutical industry.

== Companies ==
=== Nuova Ompi ===
Nuova Ompi is located in Piombino Dese (Padua) and Latina – Italy and produces pharmaceutical glass primary packaging for injectable use. It manufactures both bulk and sterile vials, cartridges, syringes. The company started supplying sterile syringes (EZ-fill Syringes) in 2007 and then it extended the ready-to-fill concept to vials and cartridges in 2010 (EZ-fill Vials & Cartridges).

=== Medical Glass ===
Medical Glass was established in Bratislava in 1991 and acquired by the Group in 2005. Today it produces glass ampoules and vials.

=== Ompi North America ===
The plant is located in Monterrey, Mexico. It was built in 2008 and doubled in 2012 in order to serve the American market with the support of the sales office situated in Newtown, Pennsylvania (USA).

In 2021 the company started to create a manufacturing site in Fishers, Indiana, United States. The company created a 200,000-square foot facility in the Fishers Life Science and Innovation Park. The site opened in early 2024 and will serve the American market with ready-to-use ("EZ-Fill") syringes and vials.

=== Ompi of China ===
The sales office is situated in Zhangjiagang, about 150 km from Shanghai. The greenfield facility construction started at the end of 2012 and the plant started production in November 2013.

=== Ompi do Brasil ===
The plant is situated in Sete Lagoas, Minas Gerais, Brazil. The greenfield facility construction started at the beginning of 2016 and the plant started production in June 2017.

=== Balda Medical ===
Located in Bad Oeynhausen (Germany), it was founded in 1908 as a camera manufacturer and developed a focus on precision injection molding in the fifties. After a diversification in mobile telephony, medical and automotive, the company focused in the medical, healthcare, diagnostic and pharmaceutical segment. In 2016 it was acquired by Stevanato Group.

=== Balda C. Brewer and Balda Precision ===
Based in Oceanside and Ontario (US), they have been acquired by Stevanato Group in 2016 and are specialized in injection molding for medical market and turning machine service supporting the Aerospace, Medical, Electronic and Consumer industries.

=== SPAMI ===
The company refers to the Engineering Systems Division of the Group and was founded in 1971. It is located in Piombino Dese (Padua) – Italy. It produces glass tubing converting machines and inspection machines for pharmaceutical glass containers.

=== InnoScan ===
The company joined the Group in 2013 and it produces high-speed inspection machines for the pharmaceutical industry.

=== SVM ===
The Danish company SVM Automatik has been acquired by Stevanato Group in 2016. It is specialized in assembly, packaging and serialization systems for the pharmaceutical industry.
