= Nerio Alessandri =

Italian entrepreneur

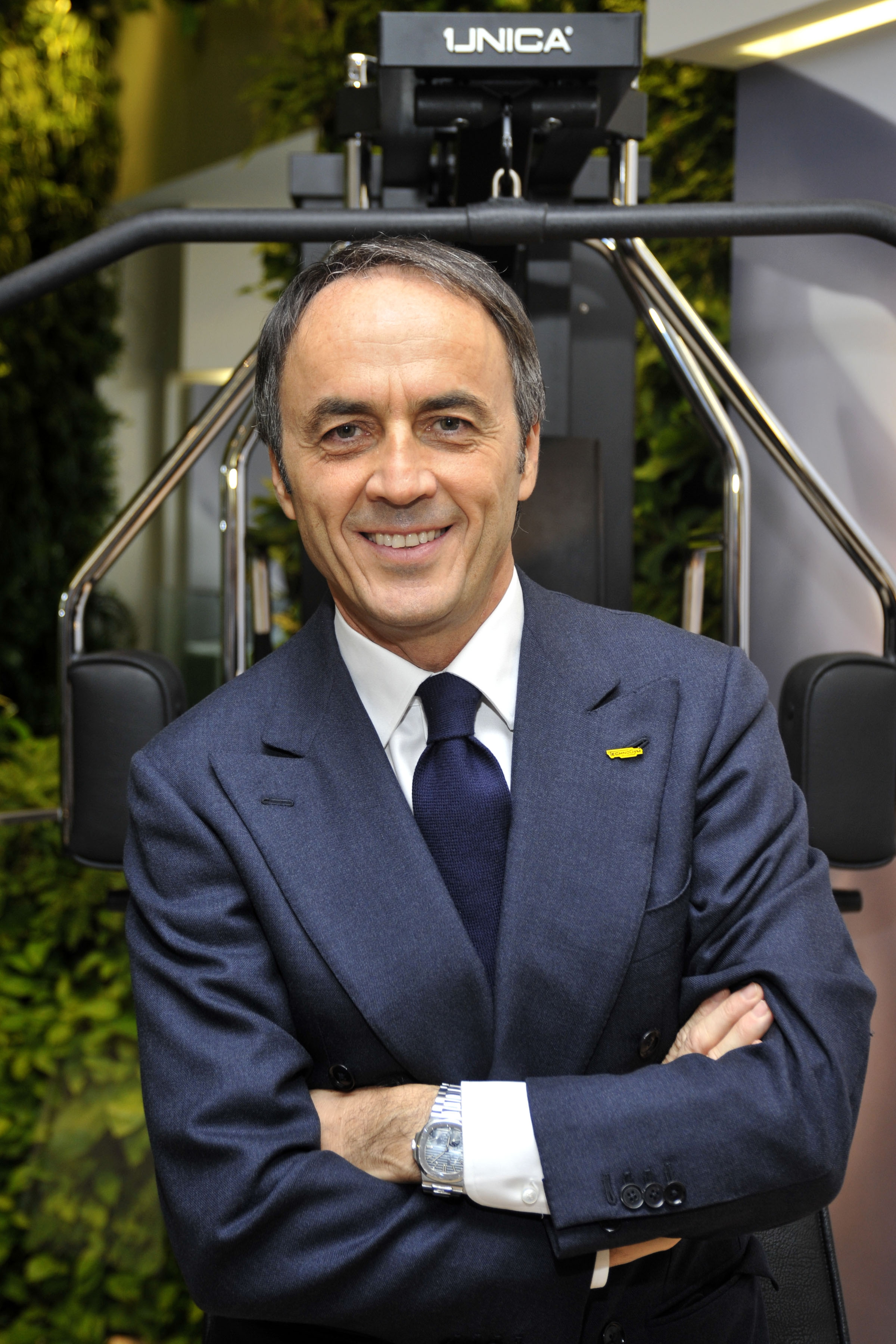
- Alessandri
- Born: Nerio Alessandri; 8 April 1961 (age 65); Gatteo, F-C, Italy
- Occupation: Entrepreneur
- Years active: 1983–present

Nerio Alessandri (Gatteo, Province of Forlì-Cesena, 8 April 1961) is an Italian entrepreneur and the president and founder of Technogym, since 1983.

== Biography ==
In 1983 Nerio Alessandri founded Technogym at the age of 22, and began building exercise equipment in the garage of his home.

In 1984 he designed the Isotonic Line, the very first Technogym training line for gyms and then in 1986 came Unica, the first, hi-tech design, home trainer.

In 1988 he patented the CPR system, a scientific algorithm for constant pulse/heart rate training that became the hallmark of Technogym products.

In 1993 at the 1st California International Conference in Rimini, Alessandri defined his Wellness concept: a lifestyle centered on regular physical activity, a balanced diet and a positive outlook. This moment marked Wellness as the foundation of the Technogym philosophy and the tagline "The Wellness Company" was added to the corporate logo.

In 2001 Alessandri was nominated "Cavaliere del Lavoro" (Knight of Industry) by the President of the Italian Republic Carlo Azeglio Ciampi, which made him the youngest-ever holder of this title in Italian history.

In November 2003 he was named Italian "Entrepreneur of the Year 2003" and then represented Italy at the "World Entrepreneur of the Year".

In March 2004 he was elected to the Association of Italian Industrialists (Confindustria) Board of Directors and this mandate was renewed in 2008 for the next four years.

In April 2004 he received an honorary degree (Laurea Honoris Causa) from the Faculty of Motor Sciences at the University of Urbino.

In 2005 he received an honorary degree in Biomedical Engineering from the University of Bologna.

In 2009 at the World Economic Forum in Davos he was among the leaders that created the Workplace Wellness Alliance. In February 2009 he was nominated for vice president of the Leonardo Committee, an association that promotes Italian quality and the image of Italy throughout the world.

In 2012 together with his brother and co-founder of Technogym Pierluigi, Nerio Alessandri inaugurated in the presence of the Italian President Giorgio Napolitano and former US President Bill Clinton the Technogym Village.

In 2014 he was awarded with Premio Leonardo by Italian President Sergio Mattarella. In 2016, together with his brother Pierluigi Alessandri, he chaired the Technogym listing ceremony at the Italian Stock Exchange.

In 2017 he was awarded by the International Olympic Committee President Thomas Bach with the President's Sport Award for his commitment in supporting the Olympic Movement. In 2019 he was part of the Italian Delegation supporting the bid for the Milano Cortina 2026 Winter Olympics.

=== Onorificenze italiane ===
ribbon for ordinary uniform

ribbon for ordinary uniform

ribbon for ordinary uniform

ribbon for ordinary uniform

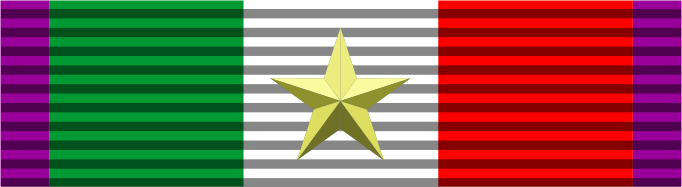
ribbon for ordinary uniform

== Wellness ==
Wellness is a lifestyle based on regular physical activity, balanced diet and a positive outlook, first defined by Nerio Alessandri in the early 90s. The concept of Wellness is founded on the ancient Roman maximum of mens sana in corpore sano (a healthy mind in a healthy body) and is a genuine alternative to the American concept of fitness. Fitness focuses on a small group of sports enthusiasts, whereas Wellness speaks to a much wider range of people who wish to improve their lifestyle.

== Wellness Foundation ==
In 2003, the Wellness Foundation was established. This nonprofit association supports scientific research, health education and the promotion of a Wellness lifestyle. The foundation operates with specific projects in the sphere of health, instruction, research, art and culture. It also promotes the Wellness Congress, an event for promoting and raising awareness of wellness issues.

As president of the Wellness Foundation, Alessandri has ideated and launched the Wellness Valley initiative to create in the Italian region of Romagna the first district of wellness and quality of life by gathering all local stakeholders (Public Administration, Business, Schools, Health Sector, Tourism, non-profit) to work together and create, in the different fields, initiatives aimed at improving wellness and people's quality of life. Every year the Wellness Foundation publishes the Wellness Valley report showing the concrete impacts of the initiative on people's health and quality of life

== Technogym ==
Alessandri is the Technogym founder and CEO. Today, Technogym is in the fitness and Wellness sector, and claims approximately 80,000 installations worldwide in wellness centres and 400,000 private homes. Technogym estimates that approximately 50 million people use its products every day.

The company has 2000 employees in 13 branches in Europe, the United States, Asia, the Middle East, Australia and South America. 90% of its turnover is made up of exports sent to over 100 different countries. Its revenues are 669M in 2019.

This company was the exclusive and official supplier for the athletes' training centers at the last seven editions of the Olympic Games: Sydney 2000, Athens 2004, Torino 2006, Beijing 2008, London 2012, Rio 2016, Pyeongchang 2018, and Tokyo 2020.

The firm currently stands at about €2.2 billion ($2.4 billion). Its share price has risen by 156% since it was listed on the Milan Stock Exchange in May 2016.

== Other entrepreneurial experiences ==
At the beginning of 2003, Alessandri became a shareholder in Enervit, a company in the sports nutrition sector. In 2006, he purchased a 4% stake in Starpool, a company based in Trentino specialized in the design and construction of health spas.

== Publications ==
In 2001 Alessandri published the book Wellness. Scegli di vivere bene (Wellness. Welcome to a better life), the manual-manifesto of the Wellness philosophy.

In 2005, Technogym and Alessandri were featured in the Italian edition of Blue Ocean Strategy, the Chan Kim – Mauborgne best seller. Featured in the 2007 publication Soft Economy, Technogym was a case study in sound and flexible Italian enterprise that represents the best of Made in Italy.

In the same year, he edited the publication Wellness-Storia e Cultura del vivere bene (Wellness-The History and Culture of Healthy Living) (Sperling & Kupfer), a volume that defines the historical and conceptual path of "wellness" through twelve essays written by Italian and international academics.

In 2008, the book A Successful Life Begins with Wellness was published in China.

In 2014 Nerio Alessandri published the book Nati per muoverci (Born to Move), the history of Technogym from a garage to the wellness economy.
