= Amplifon =

Italian hearing aid manufacturing company

Amplifon SpA
- Type: Public (Società per azioni)
- Traded as: BIT: AMP; FTSE MIB component
- Industry: Manufacturing, wholesale distribution
- Founded: 1950
- Founder: Algernon Charles Holland
- Headquarters: Milan, Italy
- Key people: Susan Carol Holland, Chairman and 44.9% owner; Enrico Vita, CEO
- Products: Hearing aids
- Revenue: €2,409.2 million (2024)
- Net income: €152 million (2024)
- Number of employees: 15,070 (2024)
- Website: corporate.amplifon.com/en

Amplifon SpA is an Italian company based in Milan and the world's largest hearing aid retailer.

== History ==
Amplifon was founded in 1950 in Milan by Algernon Charles Holland, a former official of the British special forces, involved in the Italian Resistance movement. At the end of World War II, he started a company aimed at supporting those who experienced hearing loss due to the conflict, establishing a widespread local presence and building a solid relationship with hearing care professionals.

In the 1960s and the 1970s, Amplifon opened stores in every region of Italy, becoming the market leader in the supply, sales, and fitting of hearing aids. In 1971, the Amplifon Centre for Research and Studies (CRS) was founded: an independent organisation aimed at spreading knowledge in the audiological and otological fields, through resources and research.

During the 90s, Amplifon began tailoring the services to the client, rolling out the first digital hearing aids in Italy in 1996. In this period, the company gained a market share of over 40%.

In 1992, a new company was founded in Spain, Amplifon Iberica, which expanded into Portugal a few years later. Between 1998 and 2000, Amplifon entered Switzerland, Austria, France, Netherlands and the United States markets through acquisitions.

The Amplifon stock started to be traded in the Borsa Italiana in June 2001. In the same year, they entered a joint venture with Bardissi Medical in the Middle East, in Egypt, alongside the acquisition of stores in Hungary. In 2002, Amplifon acquired the Sonus Corporation in the United States, and later in 2003 took hold of the National Hearing Centers, a company with stores located primarily in large shopping centres.

In the following years Amplifon continued its acquisition strategy in the Netherlands, Germany, the United Kingdom, Ireland and Belgium. In 2010, in fact, the company acquired 100% of National Hearing Care (NHC) in Australia, New Zealand and India. In 2012 they expanded into more regions in India, acquired 51% of Maxtone in the Turkish Market, and entered the Polish market by founding Amplifon Poland. Brazil followed in 2014 with Amplifon's purchase of 51% of shares in the Brazilian company Direito de Ouvir.

In 2016 the company invested Euro 80 million to acquire 170 stores, including two retail chains in Germany and another in Canada. In 2017, Amplifon invested a further Euro 110 million for the acquisition of 300 stores, including two retail chains in France and Portugal.

A year later, Amplifon completed its largest acquisition, acquiring the Spanish GAES for Euro 528 million. GAES has 600 stores (about 500 in Spain, and the remainder scattered across Portugal and Latin America), 1,800 employees, and 210 million in revenue.

Since 2015, the Amplifon stock value tripled, outperforming the FTSE MIB, the index of the top 40 listed companies in the Borsa Italiana. As of August 2018, the share price has risen nearly 1,000% since its IPO.

The chairman is Susan Carol Holland, daughter of Algernon, who owns 44.9% of Amplifon through her family's holding company.

== Business and operations ==
Amplifon has a 13% global market share, and is present in 26 countries, in the geographic areas of EMEA, the Americas, and APAC.

The company operates through a network of about 5,480 direct points of sale, 3,310 shop-in-shops and corners and 1,210 shops in franchising. The business is primarily focused on the sale and fitting of hearing aids.
