= Luigi Cremonini =

Italian billionaire businessman

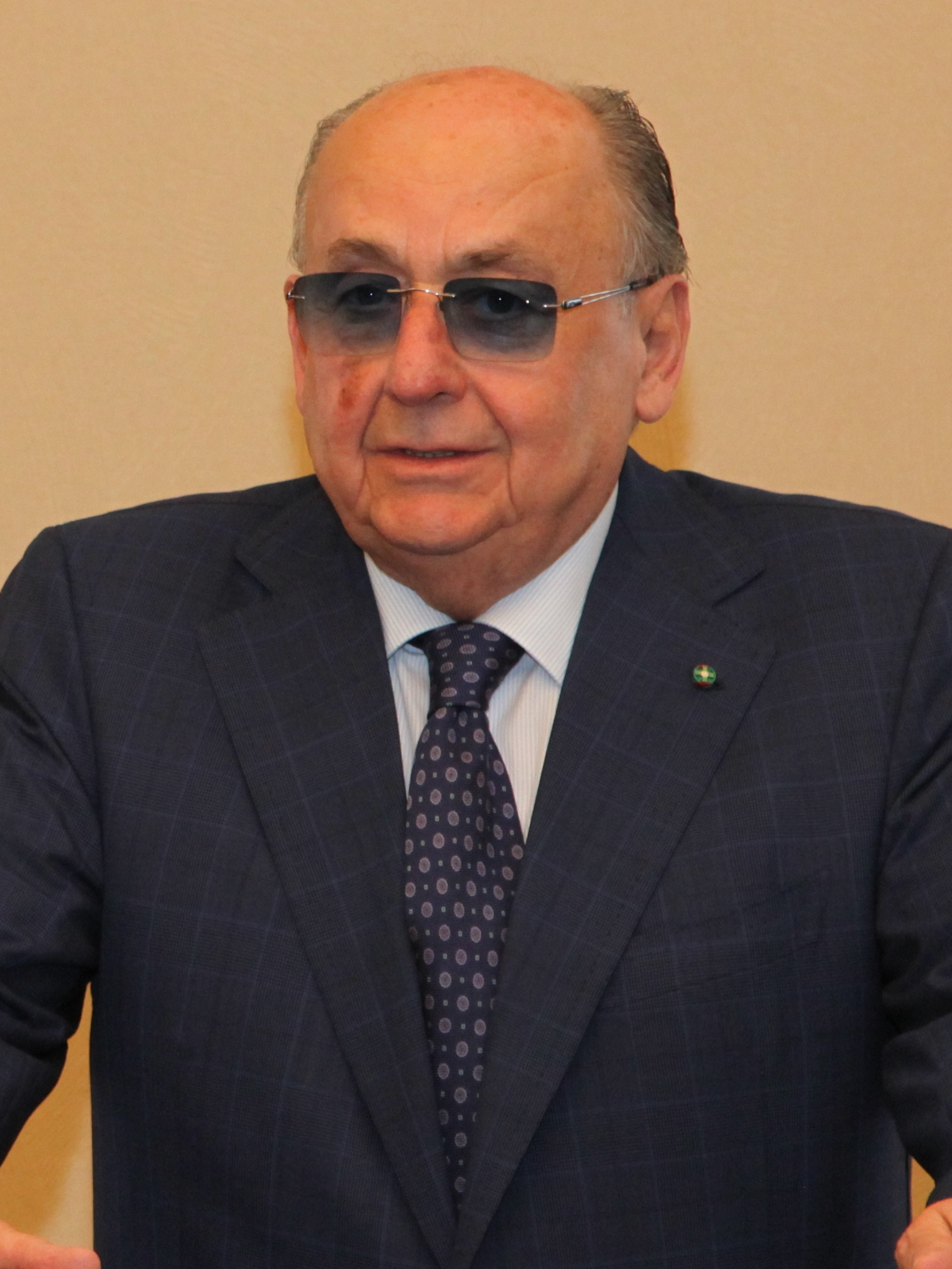
- Born: 1939 (age 86–87)
- Occupation: businessman
- Spouse: married
- Children: 4

Luigi Cremonini (born 1939) is an Italian billionaire businessman. He is the chairman of Cremonini SpA and Inalca SpA, and the honorary president of the Chamber of Commerce ItalAfrica Centrale.

== Biography ==
Luigi Cremonini was born in 1939 in Savignano sul Panaro to a farming family. At 19, he opened a pig farm.

In 1963 he opened a small butcher shop with his brother Giuseppe, a cornerstone of the Cremonini Group. In 1966 he founded Inalca, which specialized in butchering. Starting in the 1970s, the Cremonini Group incorporated several companies.

In the 1980s, Burghy (catering) was founded, then sold to McDonald's in 1996 in exchange for Inalca's supply of beef for the American chain. In 1991 the "Montana" brand (canned meat) was taken over. In 2001 he founded another restaurant chain,Roadhouse Grill, which is still active today. In the railway catering sector through Agape and Chef Express operates in eight countries, especially for services on high speed lines. At the same time through its subsidiary Inalca (jointly with the Brazilian JBS until Cremonini buys back half of the capital previously sold to it) it also expanded its business in Russia, where in 2010 it inaugurated a plant in Moscow "intended for the distribution of products made in Italy and the production of hamburgers for McDonald's in Russia."

In early 2000, according to press sources, he was the subject of a foiled kidnapping attempt.

He was a board member of Banca Popolare dell'Emilia Romagna until 2013.

In 1985 he was made a Order of Merit for Labourr. In May 1994, the University of Bologna awarded him an honorary degree.

In the cultural sphere, he financed the archaeological excavations and museum setup of the "Cremonini Space at the Trevi," completed in 2009, concerning the Vicus Caprarius area near the Trevi Fountain in Rome.

== Early life ==
Cremonini was born in 1939, into a poor farming family near Modena, Italy. He studied farming in Bologna.

== Career ==
In 1963, Cremonini opened, with his brother Giuseppe a small butcher's shop, the start of the pan-European Cremonini Group, with an annual turnover of meat products of $3.6 billion, and Marr, Italy's largest food-service distributor.

== Personal life ==
Cremonini is married, with four children, and lives in Modena, Italy.

In 1985, he was awarded the Order of Orange-Nassau by the Queen Beatrix and appointed Cavalier of Labour by the President Alessandro Pertini. In October 2009, Cremonini was presented with an "Italy in the World 2009" award at the Italian Embassy in Moscow.
