= Leonardo Del Vecchio =

Italian billionaire and businessman (1935–2022)

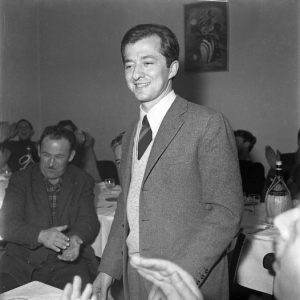
- Born: 22 May 1935; Milan, Italy
- Died: 27 June 2022 (aged 87); Segrate, Italy
- Occupations: Founder and chairman of Luxottica
- Known for: Sunglass Hut, LensCrafters, Ray-Ban, Oakley
- Children: 6, including Claudio, Leonardo Maria

Leonardo Del Vecchio (22 May 1935 – 27 June 2022) was an Italian billionaire businessman, the founder and chairman of Luxottica, the world's largest producer and retailer of glasses and frames, with 77,734 employees and over 8,000 stores. At the time of his death, his net worth was estimated at US$24.1 billion, the second richest person in Italy, and 54th in the world.

== Life and career ==
Leonardo Del Vecchio was born on 22 May 1935 in Milan, Italy, to an impoverished family from Barletta, Southern Italy. His father was a street vendor of vegetables who died before his birth and his mother already had four other children; he grew up in an orphanage. He began his career as an apprentice to a tool and die maker in Milan, but decided to turn his metalworking skills to make spectacle parts. In 1961, he moved to Agordo in the province of Belluno, which is home to most of the Italian eyewear industry. The new company was Luxottica s.a.s., a limited partnership. His partners were Francesco Da Cortà (1922–1981) and Vittorio Toscani (1927–1966) from Cadore region.

In 1969, he remained sole owner of Luxottica and started selling parts to assemble spectacle frames and injection moulded acetate frames under the Luxottica brand, before 1969 he used Metalflex brand, the company of his partners. By 1971 he exited the contract manufacturing business to focus solely on the manufacture and distribution of finished eyeglass frames, adding metal frames and acetate frames from sheet.

In 1974, he acquired Scarrone, a distribution company. In 1981, the company set up its first international subsidiary in Germany. A licensing deal with the designer Giorgio Armani was settled in 1988.

The company was listed in New York in 1990, and in Milan in December 2000, joining the MIB-30 (now S&P/MIB) index in September 2003. The listing enhanced the company's ability to acquire other brands, starting with Italian brand Vogue in 1990, Persol and US Shoe Corporation (LensCrafters) in 1995, Ray-Ban in 1999 and Sunglass Hut, Inc. in 2001.

They went looking for more retail companies, acquiring Sydney-based OPSM in 2003, Pearle Vision in 2004, Surfeyes in 2006, and Cole National in 2004. They acquired Oakley in a US$2.1 billion deal in November 2007.

Del Vecchio owned a 10% stake in Italian investment bank Mediobanca.

== Shareholdings ==
Delfin S.à r.l., the financial holding company of Leonardo Del Vecchio. Through his holding company he held the shareholdings:

- 61.90% of Luxottica then 38.4% of EssilorLuxottica, born from the merger of Luxottica with the French company Essilor;
- 28% of Covivio, a French property management company;
- 13% of Luxair, Luxembourg airline;
- 19.8% of Mediobanca, Italian investment bank;
- 9.77% of Assicurazioni Generali, Italy's biggest insurance company

== Personal life ==
Del Vecchio was married three times. He had a total of six children, and lived in Milan. He had one son, Claudio Del Vecchio, and two daughters, Marisa and Paola, with his first wife. With his second wife he had another son, Leonardo Maria; and with his third wife two sons, Luca and Clemente. He remarried his second wife in 2010.

== Death ==
Del Vecchio died from pneumonia at San Raffaele Hospital in Segrate, an eastern suburb of Milan on 27 June 2022 at the age of 87. The news of his death was announced by his company in a statement. "EssilorLuxottica sadly announces today that its chairman has passed away," the group said in a statement, adding that the board would meet to "determine the next steps".
