= Dealogic =

International financial software company

Dealogic Ltd.
- Type: Subsidiary
- Industry: Financial services, Technology
- Founded: 1983; 43 years ago
- Headquarters: London, United Kingdom
- Number of locations: 9 offices
- Parent: ION Investment Group
- Website: www.dealogic.com

Dealogic Ltd. is a financial markets platform offering integrated content, analytics, and technology via a service to financial firms. From origination to distribution and investors, the Dealogic platform provides a connection across banking, capital markets, sales and trading, and institutional investing. The company has offices located in London, New York, Hong Kong, Tokyo, Budapest, Sydney, Mumbai, São Paulo, and Beijing.

Dealogic is currently owned by ION Investment Group.

== History ==
Dealogic was founded in 1997 in the United States by Tom Fleming and Simon Hessel and in 2001 became the trading name of the combined Computasoft and CommScan entities. Computasoft was founded in 1983 in the United Kingdom by Simon Hessell, Peter Ogden, and Philip Hulme. CommScan was established in 1991 by Tom Fleming to acquire the assets of U.S. capital markets communications business Graphic Scanning Corp.

In 2009, the company acquired the investor profiles products of Ilios Partners LLC.

In 2013, the company acquired Junction RDS, the leader in ownership analysis of UK listed companies.

In 2014, global alternative asset manager The Carlyle Group, and co-investors Euromoney Institutional Investor and Randall Winn acquired Dealogic.

In 2015, Dealogic acquired A2 Access, the market leader in corporate access aggregation.

In 2017, ION Investment Group recapitalized Dealogic.

== Services ==
Dealogic content is used by global financial publications for analysis of investment banking trends, activity, and wallet share. The company provides information to a number media companies, most notably The Wall Street Journal Investment Banking Scorecard, an interactive and real-time scorecard of the world's financial markets.
