= Gustavo Denegri =

Italian businessman

- Born: March 1937 (age 89)
- Education: University of Turin
- Known for: Owner of 44% of DiaSorin
- Title: Chairman, DiaSorin
- Children: 2

Gustavo Denegri (born March 1937) is an Italian billionaire businessman, the chairman of DiaSorin, an Italian biotechnology company.

He has a bachelor's degree in chemistry from the University of Turin.

Denegri owns 44% of DiaSorin via IP Investimenti e Partecipazioni, a holding company controlled by his family. By 2020, Forbes estimated his net worth at $3.1 billion.

He is married with two children, and lives in Turin, Italy.
