= Claudio Del Vecchio =

Italian businessman

- Born: 1956 or 1957 (age 68–69); Italy
- Occupation: Businessman
- Spouse(s): Laura Ballis (divorced) Debra
- Children: 3
- Father: Leonardo Del Vecchio
- Family: Del Vecchio

Claudio Del Vecchio (born 1956) is an Italian businessman and billionaire. In February 2026, Forbes estimate his net worth at around $7.1 billion.

His father Leonardo Del Vecchio was the billionaire founder of Luxottica, an Italian eyewear company, and Claudio has been called his "heir apparent".

== Biography ==
His mother, Luciana Nervo, was Leonardo Del Vecchio's first wife; he was married three times.

In 1982, Del Vecchio was sent by his father to the United States to lead the Luxottica's US development. During his tenure as CEO of Luxottica during the 1990s, Del Vecchio took the company public, and led the acquisition of LensCrafters in 1995. In 1998, he left Luxottica. He acquired and quickly turned around the struggling retailer Casual Corner. He acquired Brooks Brothers in 2001 and sold Casual Corner in 2005. Brooks Brothers filed for bankruptcy in September 2020 and was acquired by Authentic Brands. Del Vecchio was the chairman, CEO, and owner of Brooks Brothers Group, Inc., the holding company of Brooks Brothers.

After the death of his father in 2022, he inherited a 12.5% stake in the family's Luxembourg-based holding company Delfin.

== Personal life ==
Claudio Del Vecchio lives in nine-bedroom estate in Muttontown, Long Island, that has been listed for $11 million in 2021.

His brother Leonardo Maria is head of Italian retail for Luxottica. His son Matteo is a senior vice president of EssilorLuxottica North America.

== Honors ==
- 2014: Cavaliere del Lavoro
