= Leonardo Maria Del Vecchio =

Italian businessman (born 1995)

- Born: 6 May 1995 (age 31); Milan, Italy
- Education: Bocconi University
- Occupation: Heir
- Employer: EssilorLuxottica
- Known for: LMDV Capital; Delfin
- Spouse: Anna Castellini Baldissera (m. 2022; div. 2023)
- Partner: Sara Soldati (2024–2026)
- Children: Bianca
- Parents: Leonardo Del Vecchio (father); Nicoletta Zampillo (mother)
- Family: Del Vecchio

Leonardo Maria Del Vecchio (born 6 May 1995) is an Italian heir and billionaire. In December 2025, Forbes estimated his net worth around $7.5 billion. His father Leonardo Del Vecchio was the billionaire founder of Luxottica.

== Early life and education ==
Del Vecchio was born in Milan on 6 May 1995. He is the son of Leonardo Del Vecchio and his third wife, Nicoletta Zampillo, and has three half-brothers and two half-sisters from his father's other marriages and one half-brother, Rocco Basilico, from his mother's other marriage. After studying Business Economics and Management at Bocconi University in Milan, he lived for several years between the United States and England to further his family's business. In 2017, he returned to Milan and began working at Luxottica, becoming CEO of Salmoiraghi & Viganò the following year.

== Business career ==
Del Vecchio has made investments in the restaurant, hospitality, and real estate sectors and at the end of 2025 also in the publishing sector. Investments are often made through his family office "LMDV Capital". In June 2024, LMDV Capital acquired control of Acqua Fiuggi, an Italian natural mineral water produced in Fiuggi, in the province of Frosinone, Lazio, Italy and distributed primarily in glass bottles.

Del Vecchio has created a dedicated group, controlled by LMDV Capital, called LMDV Hospitality Group, which manages all his hospitality-related activities, such as the Twiga, a beach club in Versilia, Tuscany, Italy, previously owned by Flavio Briatore that was acquired by LMDV Capital in February 2025. On 21 June 2025, it was announced that "Briatore's Billionaire" in Porto Cervo, Sardinia, Italy would also be acquired by LMDV Capital, which would rename it Twiga Porto Cervo and manage it through LMDV Hospitality Group.

In 2025, Del Vecchio, through LMDV Capital, attempted to acquire the media conglomerate GEDI Gruppo Editoriale controlled by Exor N.V., which had put it up for sale. Although this specific offer was not well received, Del Vecchio's vision of an investment in the publishing industry did not fade, and a few days later the acquisition of 30% of the daily newspaper Il Giornale, controlled by Antonio Angelucci's Tosinvest Group, was announced. Furthermore, LMDV Capital is negotiating to acquire a majority stake of QN, another publishing group.

== Personal life ==
In September 2021, Del Vecchio married Anna Castellini Baldissera in a civil ceremony at the Royal Palace in Milan, followed by a religious ceremony in Saint-Tropez in June 2022. Del Vecchio divorced Baldissera in 2023. On 13 January 2025, Del Vecchio met with Pope Francis in a private audience. On 4 July 2025, he and his partner Sara Soldati announced the birth of their daughter Bianca. But in July 2026, the relationship with Sara Soldati broke up, and a dispute began with Soldati over custody of their daughter. Soldati was admitted to the hospital three times in just a few days. In the meantime, Soldati was in a new relationship with Piero Neri.

== Wealth ==
The Del Vecchio family is among the richest and most influential in Italy. He holds a stake in the family-owned financial company Delfin, which holds a controlling stake in EssilorLuxottica, as well as significant stakes in Banca Monte dei Paschi di Siena, Mediobanca and Assicurazioni Generali. He also started his own investment company called LMDV Capital.

== Car collection ==
Leonardo Maria attended the Ferrari racing driver course and is a collector of Ferrari cars. He participated as racing driver in the Ferrari Challenge Europe series, including the Trofeo Pirelli Am series in 2020. His Ferrari collection includes exclusive and customized models, such as the Ferrari F80, which is believed to be among the first Ferrari F80 models delivered by Ferrari in Italy, if not the world.

- Ferrari F80 (Rosso corsa livery) (Vehicle registration plate: HC810SF)
- Ferrari Daytona SP3 (Black livery)
- Ferrari Monza SP2 (Black livery with central red stripes)
- Ferrari F12tdf
- Ferrari LaFerrari
- Ferrari 599 GTO
- Ferrari Enzo

In addition to these, Del vecchio is the owner of a Ferrari Purosangue (2022), which he had a minor accident with, a rear-end collision with another car, on Tangenziale Est di Milano. He is under investigation in 2026 for this accident. Also in his collection of Maserati cars is a Maserati MC12, and he owns a Pagani Huayra Roadster and an Aston Martin Valkyrie.
