= Covivio =

European property company

- Type: Real estate investment trust
- Traded as: Euronext: COV; CAC Mid 60 Component
- Industry: Commercial Real Estate; Residential Real Estate
- Founded: 1998
- Headquarters: Paris, France
- Key people: Christophe Kullmann (CEO)
- Number of employees: 1054
- Divisions: Covivio Hotels / Covivio Immobilien / Covivio SGP / Wellio
- Website: www.covivio.eu/en/

Covivio (formerly Batibail and Foncière des Régions) is a French real estate company founded in 1998.

== History ==
Batibail was created in 1998 in Metz by Charles Ruggieri.

In 2002, the company was renamed Foncière des Régions.

In 2004, it took control of the property company Bail Investissement, which according to Le Monde has assets worth €1.5 billion.

In 2007, it acquired Beni Stabili, a major player in the Italian real estate market, as well as the CB21 Tower.

The following year, during the 2008 financial crisis, the office market collapsed, with the La Défense business district near Paris particularly hard hit.

In 2014, it sold logistics assets worth €473 million to the American investment company Blackstone.

In 2016, it was one of Europe's leading real estate companies, with assets estimated at €19 billion.

In 2018, Foncière des Régions became Covivio.

In mid-2019, it reported sales of €339 million and property assets of €23.2 billion.

From the health crisis between 2020 and 2021, the real estate company will continue to diversify its business.

In 2024, Covivio announced sales of €508.8 million for the first nine months of the year.

== Business model ==
=== Activities ===
The company has three core businesses: offices, which will account for 50% of its total portfolio by mid-2024, residential in Germany (30%) and hotels (20%), with a total portfolio of €6.9 billion.

=== Shareholding ===
List of main shareholders as of September 2025.

Delfin S.à.r.l	28,03 %
Crédit Agricole Assurances	8,11 %
Groupe Covéa Finance	7,52 %
Assurances du Crédit mutuel	7,31 %
BlackRock	5,05 %
Public	43,23 %
