= CooperVision =

Company in Fairport, United States

CooperVision, Inc.
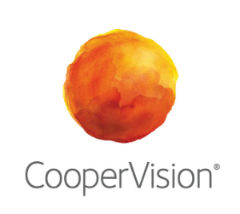
- Type: Subsidiary
- Industry: Medical devices
- Predecessor: Martin H. Smith Co., Cooper Tinsley Laboratories, Inc.
- Founded: 1958; 68 years ago
- Headquarters: San Ramon, California, United States
- Area served: Worldwide
- Key people: Daniel G. McBride (President)
- Products: Contact lenses
- Revenue: ▲$1.1 billion in fiscal (2011)
- Parent: The Cooper Companies, Inc.
- Website: coopervision.com

CooperVision is an American company that primarily manufactures soft contact lenses and is a business unit of The Cooper Companies. The company was founded in 1980, and its headquarters are in Pleasanton, California. Its products are sold in over 100 countries. CooperVision manufactures at a number of locations worldwide including in Juana Díaz, Puerto Rico; Scottsville, New York; Alajuela, Costa Rica; Gyál, Hungary; and Hamble and Southampton in Hampshire, England. It has major distribution centers in the United Kingdom, United States, and Belgium.

== History ==
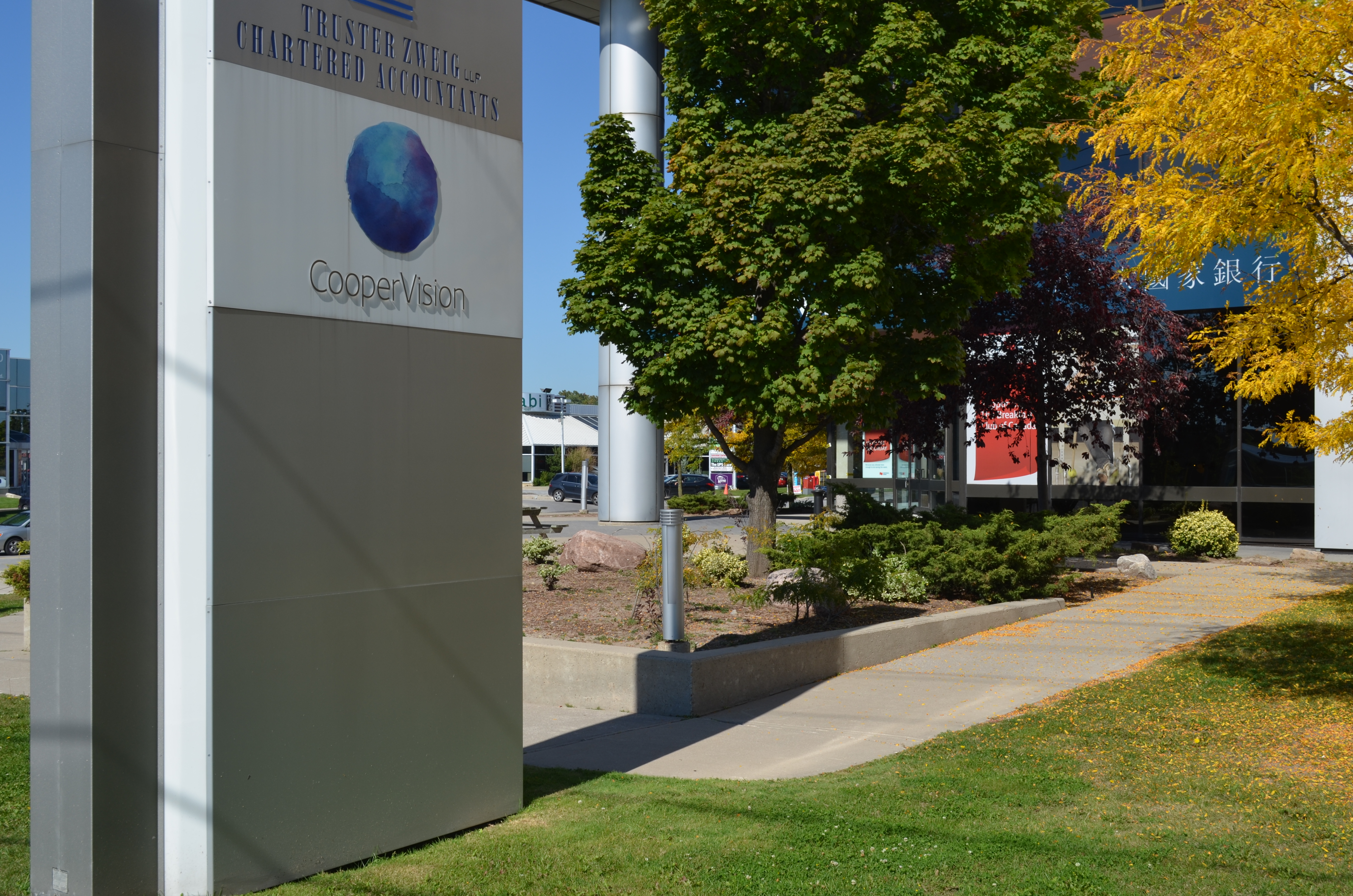
CooperVision in Ontario

CooperVision's parent company, The Cooper Companies, Inc., started in 1958 as the Martin H. Smith Co. The company name changed to Cooper Laboratories, Inc. in 1967. In 1978, the company reorganized into Cooper Laboratories, Cooper Medical Devices, Cooper Dental, Cooper International, and CooperVision. CooperVision was incorporated in 1980. The company then went public in 1983. In 1987, CooperVision, Inc. changed its name to The Cooper Companies, Inc. and organized into three groups: Cooper Technicon, CooperSurgical, and CooperVision.

In 2004, CooperVision acquired Ocular Sciences, Inc., a global manufacturer and marketer of soft contact lenses. This acquisition helped the company become the third-largest soft contact lens manufacturer in the world. The acquisition technically concluded on January 7, 2005. In 2011, CooperVision announced its rebranding, developed by Siegel+Gale, a global branding firm. In 2012, this rebrand was one of five companies to win the "Best of Awards" by REBRAND. In August 2011, CooperVision initiated a product recall certain lots of Avaira toric lenses and later spherical lenses, after identifying silicone oil residue in a limited number of lots, following customer complaints of hazy vision.

In 2013, researchers from CooperVision, along with others from Linköping University, the University of Ottawa, FibroGen Inc., and Synsam Opticians participated in a study on the partial success of artificial corneas. This study was published in Science Translational Medicine and reported on the BBC. In August 2014, CooperVision completed the acquisition of Sauflon Pharmaceuticals Limited, a UK-based manufacturer of daily disposable silicone based contact lenses.

In December 2017, CooperVision completed the acquisition of Paragon Vision Sciences. This was followed by the acquisition of Blanchard Contact Lenses in 2019, as well as GP Specialists in 2020. CooperVision acquired EnsEyes, a Danish specialty contact lens manufacturer, in June 2022. In November 2022, CooperVision announced the acquisition of SynergEyes, a hybrid contact lens manufacturer based in Carlsbad, California. The acquisition was completed in January 2023.

== Products ==
CooperVision develops, manufactures, and markets a range of contact lenses. CooperVision produces both spherical contact lenses and specialty lens products. America's Best, Walmart, Costco, Visionworks, Pearle Vision, Target Corporation and Vision Source private label contacts are manufactured by CooperVision.
