= Clearly =

Canadian online/offline retailer of eyeglasses owned by EssilorLuxottica

- Type: Subsidiary
- Industry: Internet Retailer, e-commerce
- Founded: October 4, 2000; 25 years ago (as CoastalContacts.com)
- Founders: Roger Hardy; Michaela Tokarski
- Headquarters: Vancouver, British Columbia, Canada
- Key people: Roy Hessel, Arnaud Bussières
- Products: Glasses, Contact lenses and Sunglasses
- Number of employees: 230
- Parent: Essilor
- Website: clearly.ca

Clearly is an online retailer of contact lenses, eyeglasses and sunglasses headquartered in Vancouver, British Columbia. The company, founded in 2000, is a subsidiary of the French lens manufacturer Essilor, which acquired it in 2014. Essilor merged with Luxottica in 2018 to form EssilorLuxottica, thus making Clearly a subsidiary of the new entity. Clearly is one of the largest online contact lens retailers in North America, and the largest seller of prescription eyeglasses online in the world.

== History ==
Founded in 2000 as Coastal Contacts by Roger Hardy and his sister Michaela Tokarski, who bought the keyword "contact lens" from AltaVista, which meant that all searches for "contact lens" were accompanied with Coastal Contacts' banner ads. In the first day, they had 30 orders; within the first month, they had $68,000 in sales. In addition to their lower pricing, the firm provided same day fulfillment of online orders.

In 2004, Coastal Contacts raised $6 million in an initial public offering, which they used to expand into the United Kingdom and parts of Europe. In late 2004, they acquired a mail order contact lens business in Europe, LensWay. In 2006, they acquired two more companies: one in the Netherlands and one in Japan. By 2009, the firm increased their revenue to $140 million. They moved into the eyeglasses market in 2008. They source parts for eyeglasses from independent manufactures across the globe, but maintains control over final assembly.

In January 2012, they shipped over 80,000 prescription eyeglasses, setting a service record for online sales of made-to-order prescription glasses in any one month. In 2012, the company had sold more than $1.2 billion in retail eyewear sales over the internet since inception and served more than 5 million customers.

In 2014, French lens manufacturer Essilor acquired Coastal.com and appointed Roy Hessel as CEO. Hessel, a former venture capitalist, founded online eyewear retailer Eyebuydirect in 2005. Aside with his role with Clearly, Roy Hessel is also since 2016 VP of America for the Essilor Online division. In August 2017, he appointed a new Managing Director at Clearly to help him in designing and implementing the strategy of the company.

In 2015, Clearly Contacts re-branded itself as Clearly, while also making brand name changes in other global markets such as Australia and New Zealand. In the United States, they were known as Coastal.

In September 2017, Arnaud Bussières joined Clearly as Managing Director. He became CEO in January 2018.

In 2018, Essilor merged with the Luxottica Group to become the largest eyewear retail group in the world.

In 2019, Clearly acquired Australian online retailer OzContacts.

In 2022, Coastal.com, the brand's U.S. based website, was merged into Eyebuydirect.com.

== Products ==
Clearly, then known as Coastal Contacts, initially exclusively sold contact lenses on their storefronts. As of 2017, the online store sells around 100 types of contacts, including daily and extended wear lenses, and coloured contact lenses.

In 2008, the company began selling eyeglasses and sunglasses. As of 2017, they sell glasses from over 100 brands. In 2012, they sold more than one million pairs of eyeglasses, making them the largest online seller of eyeglasses in the world.
