= Target Optical =

Eyewear retailer in the United States absorbed by EssilorLuxottica

- Industry: Eyewear, fashion, luxury, retail,
- Founded: 1995; 31 years ago, in Cleveland, Ohio
- Headquarters: Mason, Ohio, United States
- Area served: United States
- Products: Sunglasses, contact lenses, prescription glasses
- Services: Opticians, optical retail, sun retail, contact lenses
- Parent: Cole National Corporation (1995-2004); Luxottica (2004-2018); EssilorLuxottica (2018–present)
- Website: targetoptical.com

Target Optical is an optical company in the United States. It operates optical stores inside Target stores in the United States, under a licensing agreement between EssilorLuxottica and Target Corporation that was last renewed in February 2023.

== History ==
Target Optical was founded by the Cole National Corporation in 1995 in Cleveland, Ohio. In 2004, the Cole National Corporation was acquired by the Italian Luxottica. along with other Cole National Corporation holdings such as Pearle Vision. Luxottica folded Cole's operations into its North American Retail Group and the Cole structure was dissolved.

Target Optical headquarters is located in the North American Retail Group's headquarters in Mason, Ohio.
