= Foster Grant =

American brand of eyewear owned by EssilorLuxottica

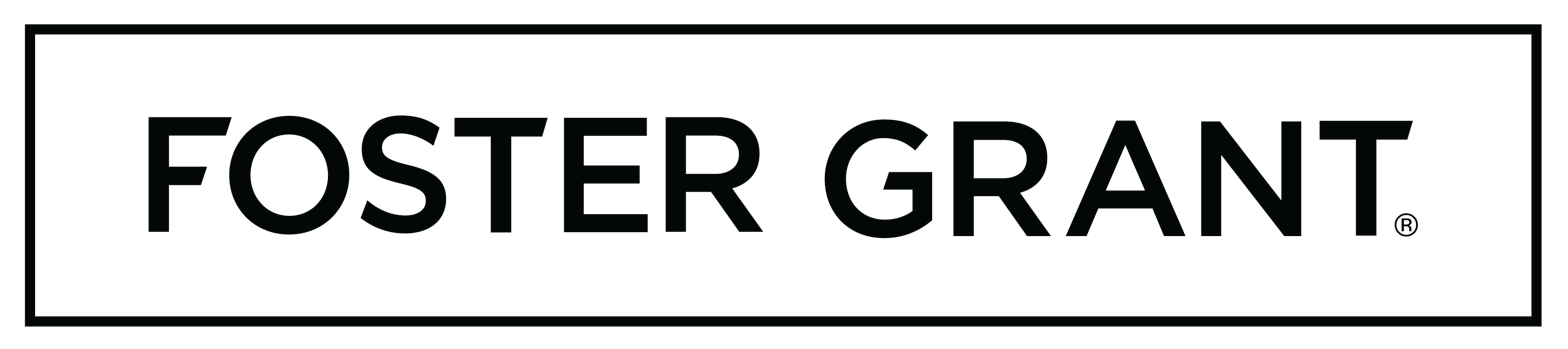
- Type: Subsidiary
- Traded as: Nasdaq: FGX (until 2010)
- Founded: 1919
- Founder: Sam Foster
- Headquarters: Smithfield, Rhode Island, United States
- Key people: Alex Bernhardt (President)
- Products: Eyewear and sunglasses
- Parent: EssilorLuxottica via FGX International
- Website: fostergrant.com

Foster Grant, or FosterGrant, is an American brand of eyewear founded by Sam Foster in 1919. The Foster Grant brand is a subsidiary company of FGX International, a consumer goods wholesaler with headquarters in Smithfield, Rhode Island, which has been owned by Essilor, today EssilorLuxottica, since 2010.

== History ==
In 1919 in Leominster, Massachusetts, Sam Foster left his employer, the pioneering plastics manufacturer Viscoloid, to form his own plastics company in a former industrial laundry.

In the 1850s, celluloid was invented as a substitute for substances such as ivory and tortoiseshell. One major use for the new substance was in the production of hair combs, and this was Foster's first major product at his new company.

Foster Grant's original production line was ladies' hair accessories; over the company's lifetime, they have also produced other plastic materials, including heart-lung pumps.

In the 1920s, Hollywood actresses (featured on celluloid film) started wearing shorter hairstyles. These became popular, causing a collapse in the market for combs, and threatening Foster Grant. However, the development of injection molding technology made it possible to produce mass market celluloid sunglasses. Sales rapidly increased with Hollywood stars being featured in advertising campaigns, and the company became a major player in the sunglasses' industry.

In 1934, Foster Grant purchased the first plastics injection molding machine to be imported from Europe; however, the machine arrived in non-working condition. Grant and a team of experts worked for several years to make the machine functional and reliable.

Foster Grant's 1960s and 1970s sunglasses ad campaign "Who's that behind those Foster Grants?", included celebrities Peter Sellers, Louis Jourdan, Carroll Baker, Claudia Cardinale, Elke Sommer, Anita Ekberg, Vittorio Gassman, Anthony Quinn, Mia Farrow, Robert Goulet, Julie Christie, Woody Allen, O. J. Simpson, Raquel Welch, Terence Stamp, Clayton Moore, and Vanessa Redgrave.

Hoechst acquired Foster Grant in 1974. Andlinger & Co. acquired Foster Grant from Hoechst in 1986. The purchase was not successful and the company filed for bankruptcy in 1990. Bonneau acquired the Foster Grant sunglasses business out of bankruptcy. Benson Eyecare (later BEC) acquired Bonneau in 1993. BEC sold Foster Grant to costume jewelry company Aai in 1996; Aai later took the Foster Grant name. The "Who's that behind those Foster Grants?" ad campaign was reintroduced around the year 2000 with model Cindy Crawford and race car driver Jeff Gordon.)

Beginning in January 2009, Raquel Welch was the star of a national television advertising campaign for the Foster Grant Reading Glasses collection. FGX International spent over $12 million on television advertising in 2009. The ads were created by Ferrara & Co. of Princeton, New Jersey, and produced by television director Bob Giraldi.

Foster Grant launched television commercials in 2010, once again with actress Raquel Welch. That year also saw FGX International be acquired by the French lens maker Essilor for $575 million, with FGX delisting from the Nasdaq stock exchange that year. Essilor would keep the company's current management, though paid FGX shareholders in cash rather than stock. Essilor would later go onto acquire Ray-Ban maker Luxottica in 2018, changing its name to EssilorLuxottica in the process.

In 2018, FGX International acquired Indiana-based One Click Ventures. One Click Ventures is parent company to eyewear brands Readers.com, Sunglass Warehouse, and felix+iris. In 2019, Foster Grant began selling on Sunglass Warehouse's website.
