= USFI =

American advertising agency

Deluxe - Dallas
- Formerly: US Forms, Inc.; USFI; Deluxe Branded Marketing - Dallas
- Type: Subsidiary
- Founded: 1984; 42 years ago
- Founder: Faisal Ahmad
- Headquarters: Dallas, Texas, United States
- Parent: Deluxe Corporation

Deluxe - Dallas (formerly known as US Forms, USFI, USFI a business unit of Safeguard, and Deluxe Branded Marketing - Dallas) is a full–service print and promotional products company based in Dallas, Texas. Deluxe - Dallas has regional sales offices in New York, Florida, Arizona, and Colorado. Deluxe - Dallas serves over 2,600 clients in the hospitality and retail industries in the United States and in various countries worldwide. Deluxe - Dallas is part of Deluxe Corporation which is headquartered in Shoreview, Minnesota.

== Timeline ==
- 1984 – Faisal Ahmad leaves Burroughs Corp to start US Forms Inc., acquiring first account, Pearle Vision
- 1986 – Administrative assistant hired
- 1987 – Nancy Henger joins company, acquires Omega Optical account
- 1990 – Steven Sutor hired as Controller
- 1990 – David Porter joins as Marketing Representative and acquires PageMart and Sears Employee Credit Union accounts
- 1991 – Core competencies expand to enable becoming Omega's Agency of Record, producing Magazine ads and printed four–color work
- 1991 – Dedicated creative department established by Ed Angerstein
- 1993 – Tim VanCleave hired as ninth employee to generate new business – acquired Parkland Hospital account to significantly grow revenue
- 1993 – USFI recognized as one of Top 100 Fastest Growing Companies by SMU Cox School of Business
- 1995 – Steve Ealy hired to manage expansion of newly computerized creative department
- 1997 – USFI Gains GTE Directories, designs and produces directory covers nationwide as well as collateral
- 1997 – Steven Sutor moves from Controller position to build an IT department
- 2000 – USFI launches new cellular provider MetroPCS via print, web, in–store campaigns
- 2000 – USFI surpasses $10 million in annual sales, explores web marketing capabilities
- 2001 – Dedicated Hospitality Division is founded
- 2003 – Hospitality Reps expand to key markets nationwide, company legally changes name to USFI
- 2003 – Robert Lyman joins the company for technology business development and MetroPCS account service
- 2004 – First USFI Distribution Center is established
- 2006 – USFI surpasses $20 million in annual sales
- 2007 - Caryl Barrineau hired to develop business and sales operations.
- 2008 – Dan Zipes is hired to convert Distribution Center into Logistics and Supply Chain Division
- 2008 – USFI/GreenWorks is launched, a web–source of green products and information for hospitality, academic and other markets
- 2009 – USFI at 25 year mark receives full identity re–design and positioning
- 2011 – USFI hires Douglas Ritter as VP of Marketing and Business Development
- 2012 – USFI launches new e-commerce effort, Vertical Cubed, based on a Kentico platform
- 2012 – Faisal Ahmad, CEO and President of USFI passes away on Friday March 2
- 2012 – USFI names Douglas Ritter President of USFI on March 5
- 2012 - USFI launches new Health & Beauty division on March 10
- 2012 - USFI shuts down Vertical Cubed and outsources the Digital Design with a partner
- 2015 - Safeguard Business Acquisitions and Mergers (BAM), part of Deluxe Corporation, finalizes an asset purchase of USFI, now known as USFI, a business unit of Safeguard.
- 2019 - USFI rebrands as Deluxe Branded Marketing - Dallas.
- 2020 - Deluxe Corporation undergoes logo rebrand which is cascaded to Deluxe - Dallas.
