= OPSM =

Australian eyeglass retailer owned by EssilorLuxottica

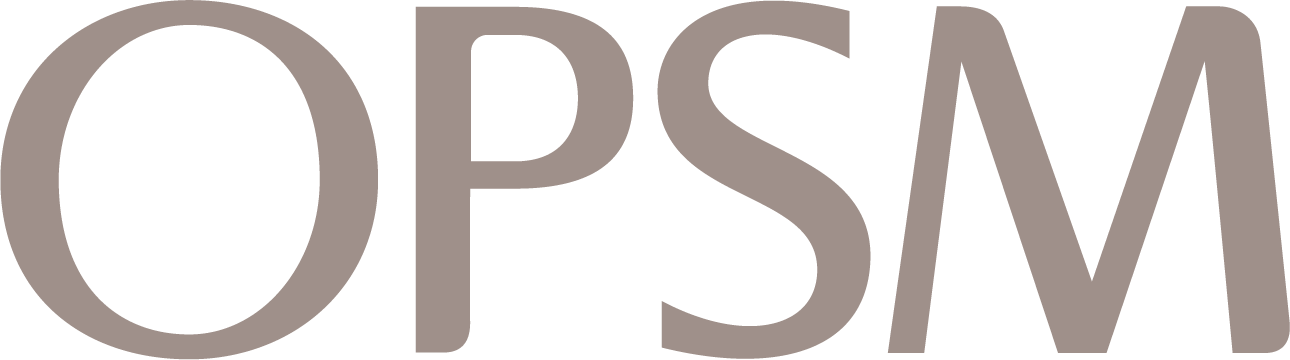
- Type: Public
- Traded as: ASX: OPS
- Industry: Optical retail, Eyewear
- Founded: 1932; 94 years ago
- Headquarters: North Sydney, Australia
- Area served: Australia, New Zealand
- Owner: EssilorLuxottica
- Divisions: Budget Eyewear; Laubman & Pank; OPSM; Ray-Ban Optical
- Website: www.opsm.com.au

OPSM (Optical Prescription Spectacle Makers) is a retailer of eye glasses in Australia and New Zealand, with locations in Hong Kong, Singapore, and Malaysia. It is owned by EssilorLuxottica, a French-Italian eyewear conglomerate.

== History ==
OPSM was founded in Sydney in 1932, and was floated on the Australian Securities Exchange in 1962. In May 2001, OPSM sold its Protector Safety Supply Group to Howard Smith. Luxottica acquired a controlling interest in 2003 and in February 2005, OPSM was delisted from the Australian Securities Exchange.

In 2010, OPSM opened the Eye Hub concept store in the Melbourne suburb of Hawthorn, combining optometry and ophthalmology into one practice. As to 2018, it operated 330 stores and 41 franchises.

== Laubman & Pank ==
Laubman & Pank became at one stage the largest eye care business in Australia. It began operations in 1908 with two optometrists deciding to set up their own business. The group was acquired by OPSM in 2001 and is now run by Luxottica, the world's biggest eye care and eyewear conglomerate. Laubman & Pank has 38 stores in Australia.

== Hong Kong ==
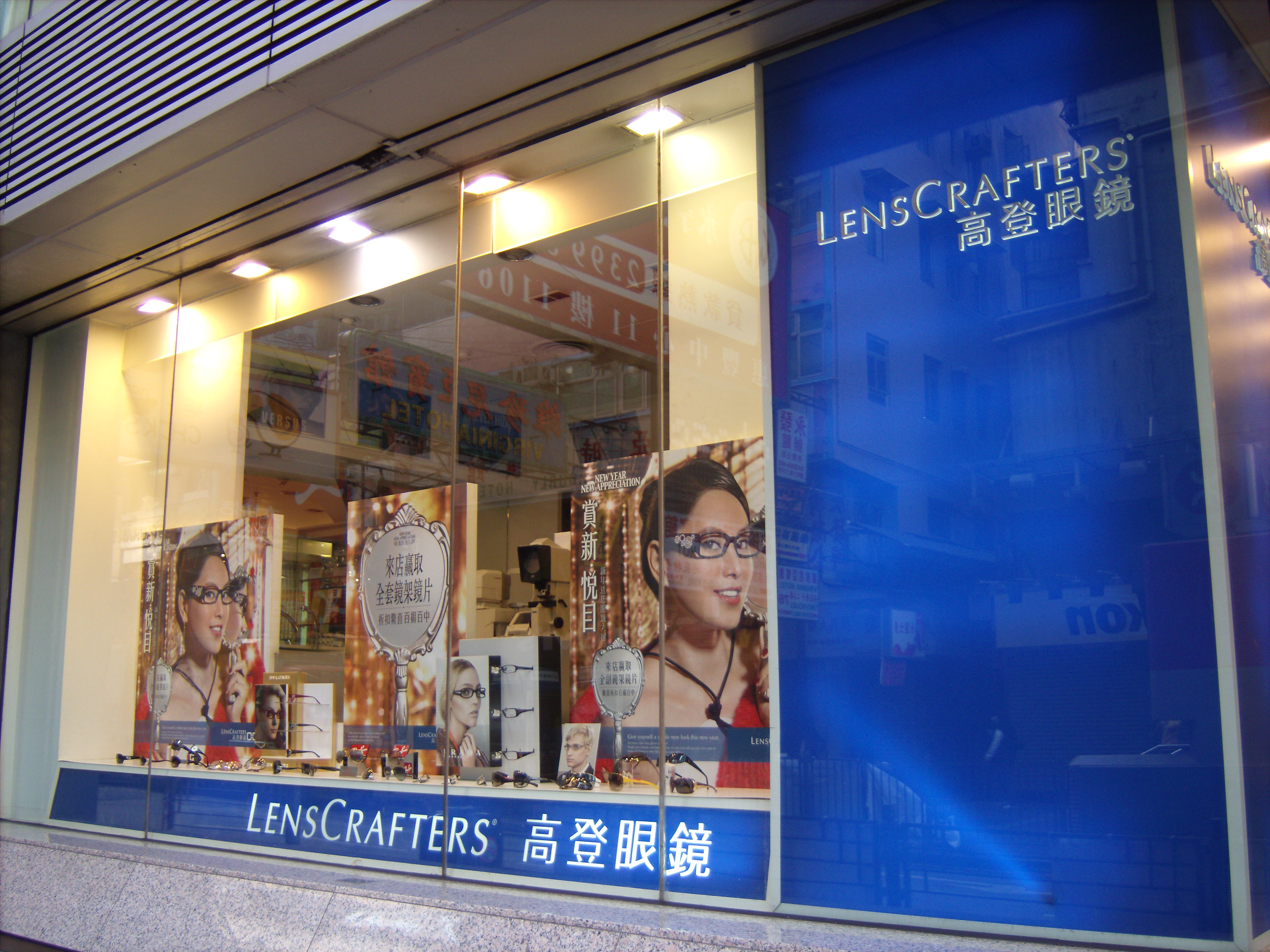
LensCrafters 高登眼鏡 in Hong Kong in 2008

OPSM acquired The Optical Centre (Chinese: 藝視眼鏡) from Michael Miu in 2002. At that time OPSM also owned another Hong Kong–based chain The Optical Shop (known in Chinese under the brand 高登眼鏡). Nowadays Luxottica group runs the Hong Kong chain under dual-brand LensCrafters 高登眼鏡. It also used the brand Sunglass Hut.
