= Bargad =

Bargad may refer to:

== Places ==
- A village in the Republic of Chad

== Other ==
- A name for the banyan tree in the Hindi language
- Luxottica's new brand of glasses
