= Eyebuydirect =

American retailer of prescription eyeglasses owned by EssilorLuxottica

Eyebuydirect, Inc.
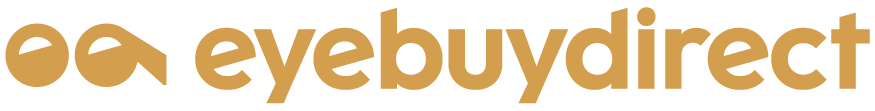
- Company type: Subsidiary
- Industry: Online retail
- Founded: 2005; 20 years ago
- Founder: Roy Hessel
- Headquarters: Austin, Texas, U.S.
- Key people: Sunny Jiang (CEO)
- Products: Eyewear
- Parent: Essilor (2013–present); EssilorLuxottica (2018–present)
- Website: eyebuydirect.com

Eyebuydirect, Inc. is an online retailer of prescription glasses, based in Austin, Texas. Eyebuydirect also sells prescription and non-prescription sunglasses, sport sunglasses, and computer glasses designed to reduce glare.

Eyebuydirect was founded in 2005 by Roy Hessel, who was succeeded by Sunny Jiang, chief executive officer in 2017. Majority-owned by Essilor since 2013, it is now a subsidiary of EssilorLuxottica since Essilor's merger with Luxottica in 2018. The company has operations in the United States and China, and sells its products worldwide.

== History ==
Eyebuydirect was founded in 2005 by Roy Hessel, a former venture capitalist. The company launched Eyebuydirect.com in March 2006.

In 2007, Eyebuydirect added EyeTry, a "try-on" function, to its site. The function allows users to upload photos and then superimpose Eyebuydirect's glasses overtop their photos to "try on" the glasses. The company later launched the "Wall of Frame", a social network that allows customers to share their created pictures and interact with other site users.

In February 2010, Eyebuydirect began incorporating facial recognition technology to its site to give users the ability to measure their pupillary distance using user-submitted photographs.

In 2013, French lens manufacturer Essilor purchased a majority stake in Eyebuydirect. Essilor had previously purchased Framesdirect.com in 2010. Hessel was retained as Eyebuydirect CEO.

Eyebuydirect redesigned and relaunched its website in April 2014.

Eyebuydirect introduced EyeZen digital screen protection lenses from Essilor as an option to customers in 2016. The company still sells EBD Blue lenses.

Eyebuydirect sells only EBD Blue Lenses as of 2022.

== Operations ==
Eyebuydirect is an online-only retailer and designs and custom-makes most of its glasses in-house. They carry primarily affordable eyeglasses, but also offer three premium brands. Ray-Ban, Oakley, ARNETTE and Vogue Eyewear are their outside premium brand offerings, while RFLKT is their in house premium brand. According to the company, 50 percent of its revenue came from repeat customers in 2013.

Customers must have a valid prescription prior to purchasing prescription eyeglasses from Eyebuydirect. The company sells multiple types of lenses, including bifocal, progressive, and Transitions lenses. As of January 2020, Eyebuydirect has launched their 2-day delivery within the United States.
