= Varilux =

Eyewear brand owned by EssilorLuxottica

French Varilux Logo

Varilux is a brand name belonging to Essilor International, a producer of corrective lenses. The first version of the lens was invented by Bernard Maitenaz and released in 1959, and was the first modern progressive lens to correct presbyopia. The progressive lens is characterized by correcting near, intermediate and far vision.

== History ==
=== Previous attempts to create a progressive lens ===
Progressive lenses The first patent for a progressive lens was British Patent 15,735, granted to Owen Aves with a 1907 priority date. Aves' patent included the progressive lens design and the manufacturing process. However this was unlike modern progressive lenses. It consisted of a conical back surface and a cylindrical front with opposing axes in order to create a power progression. This design was never commercialized. However, due to this patent, Essilor cannot technically be considered the creator of the first progressive lens.

While there were several intermediate steps (H. Newbold appears to have designed a similar lens to Aves around 1913), there is evidence to suggest that Duke Elder in 1922 developed the world's first commercially available progressive lens (Ultrifo) sold by "Gowlland of Montreal". This was based on an arrangement of aspherical surfaces.

=== The idea ===
Following in his father's and in his grandfather's footsteps, Bernard Maitenaz joined Société des Lunetiers (which became Essel, and is now Essilor) in 1948 as a research engineer after receiving diplomas from École Nationale Supérieure des Arts et Métiers and Institut d'Optique. The idea of the progressive lens came to him as he tried on his father's bifocal lenses. The abrupt transition of power seemed unnatural to him, and he believed it to be more rational to use a lens that would correct far vision on the upper portion of the lens, intermediate vision in its middle part and near vision in its lower part.

On March 2, 1951, Bernard Maitenaz deposited an envelope at the National Institute of Industrial Property in France which included four drawings and mechanical data that would make it possible to manufacture the modern-day progressive lens. On November 25, 1953, Essel submitted a first patent on his invention.

=== The first progressive lens ===
After patents and calculations, this type of progressive lens appeared to be possible, but had yet to be manufactured. Maitenaz and his team began producing progressive lenses using a variety of different improvised techniques and by 1958, Essel had developed machinery capable of mass manufacturing them.

After testing the results on 46 people in January 1959, 5 gave excellent responses, 29 good responses, 2 average responses and 10 poor responses.

=== The Varilux brand ===
Closer to the product launch, numerous pricing strategies had been elaborated. In the end, Maintenaz's invention would be fixed between Essel's bifocal lens, the Diachrolux, and its trifocal lens, the Trilux. Without much brainstorming, Maintenaz's progressive lens was given a name following suit with the other premium products: Varilux. The lens was launched officially in May 1959 at the Hotel Lutetia in Paris, France.

=== International appeal ===
Following the launch of Varilux, Essel set forth a plan for Varilux to be present outside France. Through a number of partnerships and distribution deals, the Varilux lens began its distribution in a number of countries in the 1960s, including the Netherlands, Germany, United Kingdom, United States, Canada, Brazil and Japan.

From sales of 6,000 lenses in 1959 to 2,000,000 in 1969, Varilux was becoming a successful venture, but the market still had some concerns regarding the adaptation time to the lens. Still working at improving his original invention using new technologies and calculations, Maitenaz and his team were working on the design of a new progressive lens with less aberration, which would in theory provide a higher level of comfort to the wearer.

=== Varilux 2 ===
At the start of 1969, two companies dominated the French ophthalmic lens market: Essel and Silor. Although both had created innovations of their own (Essel with Varilux and Silor with the Orma 1000 organic material), they were not major players on the international market. On January 1, 1972, Essel and Silor merged and formed Essilor. With this newly formed merger, Essilor launched the Varilux 2 in Europe, which adopted a better design than its predecessor and lighter lens material.

=== The new generations of Varilux ===
As new technologies and manufacturing processes were being developed, the research efforts concerning Varilux continued. In 1988, the result came with Varilux Multi-Design, or VMD. The Multi-Design concept was a first stage of personalization of the progressive lens, a specific optimum design for each age class of the presbyopic wearer. By the end of this decade, Essilor would become the world's leading manufacturer in ophthalmic optical products.

In 1993, Varilux Comfort was launched and became the world's best-selling progressive lens. Varilux Comfort represented a new concept of the progressive lens; it was the first progressive lens which combined the advantages of a "hard" design (type Varilux) and a "soft" design (type Varilux 2). The new surfacing techniques developed by Essilor made the adaptation much quicker than on previous progressive lenses and provided comfortable vision in all postures.

Finally, in the 21st century, Essilor launched Varilux Panamic (2002), Varilux Ellipse (2004), Varilux Physio (2006), Varilux Ipseo (2008).

== Research and development ==
With the launch of Varilux Comfort in 1993, Essilor developed the dioptric loop method, making it possible to gauge wearer satisfaction. It involves using repetition until an effective result is achieved for the wearer. It comprises five stages:

- Collection of the wearer's physiological data
- Optical design
- Creation of prototype lenses
- Measurement control
- Clinical tests

In 2008, the Varilux Ipseo New Edition was designed using Essilor's Virtual Reality system.

== Varilux Experience ==
In 2008, Essilor designed the Varilux Experience, a virtual simulation concept using the various ophthalmic solutions offered to presbyopes.

Varilux Experience demonstrates the technologies used to produce Varilux lenses, which are quite similar to those used in research laboratories, so as to provide an effective communication aid for optical professionals and their customers with presbyopia.

In a theater showing a 3D film, viewers wearing polarized, stereoscopic glasses follow in the footsteps of a young man with presbyopia. Stage-by-stage, he experiences the vision produced by single-vision and bifocal lenses, and then that of standard progressive lenses, and ultimately Varilux lenses.

The world premiere of Varilux Experience marked Varilux's 50th anniversary and took place at the SILMO optical trade fair, which ran from October 30 to November 2, 2008, at Paris' Porte de Versailles.

== Varilux Designs ==
=== 1959: Varilux ===
As the first progressive lens, Varilux allowed wearers with presbyopia with a correction for near vision, intermediate vision and far vision, on the same lens.

=== 1972: Varilux 2 ===
With the merger of Essel and Silor (forming Essilor), new innovations were delivered on the Varilux 2. Essilor claimed that this new lens provided increased comfort and further ease of adaptation.

=== 1988: Varilux Multi-Design (Varilux Infinity) ===
The Varilux Multi-Design claimed to maintain the breadth of the near-vision field regardless of the addition degree.

=== 1993: Varilux Comfort ===
As Essilor's best selling lens, the world #1 selling progressive lens the Varilux Comfort has been subject to several studies. It was the first product designed to take visual ergonomic criteria into account.

=== 2000: Varilux Panamic ===
The Varilux Panamic lens is based on Global Design Management, a technology that manages central, peripheral and binocular vision parameters.

=== 2004: Varilux Ellipse ===
The Varilux Ellipse lens enables those with presbyopia to wear small frames and a progressive lens.

=== 2006: Varilux Physio ===
The Varilux Physio progressive lens is characterized by an improvement in colour contrast and wider fields of vision. It derives its performance from a patented innovation called the Twin RX Technology which combines a method for calculating lens optics, Essilor's Wavefront Management System and advanced digital surfacing. The progressive lens is also available as the Varilux Physio F-360, which require more measurements and is therefore more personalized.

=== 2008: Varilux Ipseo New Edition ===
The Varilux Ipseo New Edition is the first lens designed and tested using a virtual simulator. The lens is personalized to the wearer's visual behaviour, using 10 customization criteria. To do so, it uses the Vision Print System, which measures a personal diagnosis of eye and head movement.

=== 2012: Varilux s Series ===
In this series, the glasses are divided into tiny segments, which leads to a balanced view.

=== 2014: Varilux e Series ===
Complex technologies reduce the swimming effects and thus make it easier to get used to.

=== 2017: Varilux X Series ===
The Varilux X Series optimizes visual performance for tasks within arm's reach. Its technology ensures simultaneous vision of multiple near distances to achieve high visual clarity for activities at all distances and reduce the number of head movements necessary to find the optimal point of focus.
