= The Cooper Companies =

American medical device company

The Cooper Companies, Inc.
- Formerly: Cooper, Tinsley Laboratories, Inc. (1961 - 1967); Cooper Laboratories, Inc. (1967 - 1987)
- Company type: Public
- Traded as: Nasdaq: COO; S&P 500 component
- Industry: Medical Devices
- Founded: 1958; 68 years ago
- Headquarters: San Ramon, California, U.S.
- Area served: Worldwide
- Key people: Albert G. White III (President & CEO)
- Products: Medical Devices
- Revenue: ▲US$4.09 billion (2025)
- Operating income: ▼US$683 million (2025)
- Net income: ▼US$375 million (2025)
- Total assets: ▲US$12.4 billion (2025)
- Total equity: ▲US$8.24 billion (2025)
- Number of employees: 15,000 (2025)
- Website: coopercos.com

The Cooper Companies, Inc., branded as CooperCompanies, is a global medical device company headquartered in San Ramon, California. The company consists of two business units, CooperVision (CVI) which manufactures contact lenses, and CooperSurgical (CSI), which manufactures medical devices and fertility and genomic products for the women's healthcare market.

== History ==
Parker Montgomery, a lawyer, bought Martin H. Smith Co. in 1958. The company was renamed to Cooper, Tinsley Laboratories, Inc. in 1961. Its name was changed to Cooper Laboratories Inc. in 1967, and entered the contact lens business when it acquired British lens maker GlobalVision in 1972.

In 1980, Cooper Laboratories reorganized into three business groups: CooperVision, CooperCare and CooperBiomedical, with Cooper Medical Devices Corp. added as a fourth group one year later.

The company was renamed The Cooper Companies in 1987. Three years later, it was further restructured into three business units: CooperVision, CooperSurgical and CooperVision Pharmaceuticals (dissolved in 2003).

Currently, the firm operates as two business units: CooperVision and CooperSurgical. CooperVision serves contact lens wearers and eye care practitioners. Products include a range of daily, two-week and monthly disposable contact lenses, and other spherical, toric and multifocal lenses for astigmatism, nearsightedness and farsightedness, and presbyopia.

CooperSurgical is the medical device and fertility and genomics unit of the companies. It became a business unit in 1990 and its focus includes women's health and fertility. It is headquartered in Trumbull, Connecticut.

== Acquisitions ==
Ocular Sciences Inc. was acquired by CooperVision in 2005.

CooperSurgical acquired AEGEA Medical, a medical manufacturing company in February 2021. A month later, in March, the company acquired Safe Obstetric Systems, and in December 2021, CooperSurgical acquired Generate Life Sciences for $1.6 billion.

In March 2022, CooperSurgical acquired Cook Medical's reproductive health business for $875 million. During that same year the company acquired EnsEyers, a supplier of orthokeratology and scleral contact lenses.

== See also ==
- List of S&P 400 companies
