= Sunglass Hut =

American sunglasses retailer owned by EssilorLuxottica

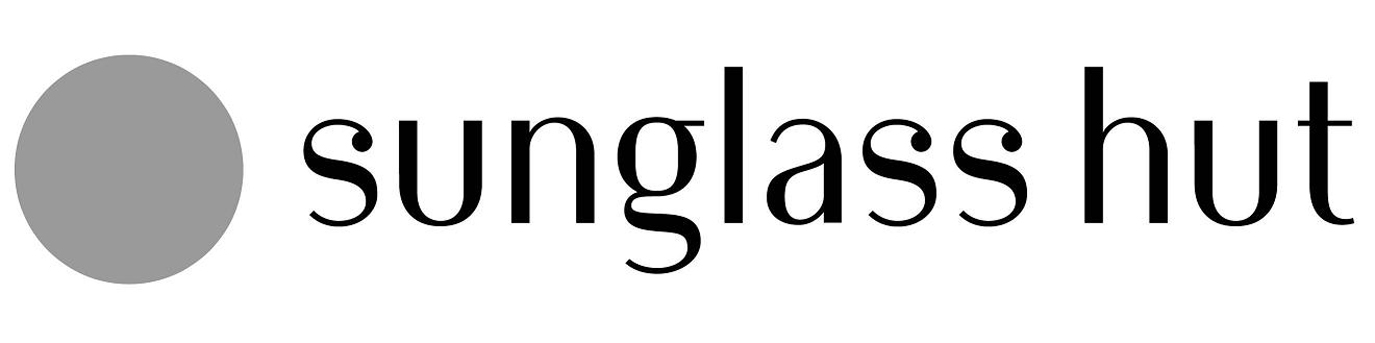
- Current logo

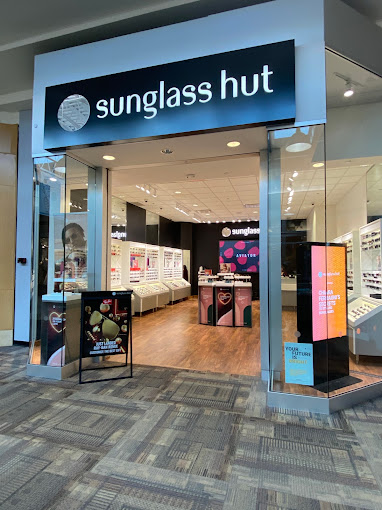
- Sunglass Hut located inside Southern Park Mall.
- Formerly: SGH, Sunglass Hut International, Sunglass Hut-Watch Station
- Type: Public
- Industry: Retail - specialty
- Founded: 1971; 55 years ago Miami, Florida, U.S.
- Founder: Sanford L. Ziff
- Products: Sunglasses, watches, sunglass accessories
- Number of employees: 10,000
- Parent: Luxottica
- Website: sunglasshut.com

Sunglass Hut is an international retailer of sunglasses and sunglass accessories founded in Miami, Florida, United States, in 1971. Sunglass Hut is part of the Italian-based Luxottica Group, the world’s largest eyewear company.

As of December 31, 2008, the Luxottica Group operated 2,286 stores around the world, most of those as part of the Sunglass Hut brand. By 2024 there were over 3,000 retail outlets under this brand name.

Sunglass Hut stores are located in India, the United States, Mexico, Canada, the Caribbean, Brazil, continental Europe, the United Kingdom, Australia, New Zealand, Hong Kong, Singapore, South Africa and the Middle East.

== History ==
The first Sunglass Hut store opened in 1971 when optometrist Sanford L. Ziff set up in a freestanding kiosk in Kendall's Dadeland Mall. The success of this kiosk prompted Ziff to open other Sunglass Hut locations in Miami, and by 1986, Ziff had opened approximately 100 Sunglass Hut outlets, achieving sales of $24 million a year.

In 1986 Ziff sold a 75% stake in Sunglass Hut to Connecticut investment firm Kidd, Kamm & Co. for $35 million. Ziff retained the company’s existing management team and shifted part ownership to his son, Dean. Following the partial acquisition, the business was incorporated under the name Sunglass Hut International, Inc.

Ziff retired from Sunglass Hut in 1989. He and his family retained a 25 percent stake in the business, but were no longer involved in its day-to-day operation. They retained the stake until 1991, when the company's annual sales surpassed $100 million, and the Ziff family sold the portion of Sunglass Hut that remained in their control.

In 1993, Sunglass Hut International, Inc. became a public company, with an initial public offering of US$70-million, and by 1996, Sunglass Hut possessed a 30 percent share of the sunglass market in the United States. The company also began selling watches under the names Watch Station, Watch World, and as combined Sunglass Hut-Watch Station stores.

Sunglass Hut entered e-commerce in 1998 when it added the ability to purchase sunglasses to its US website.

In February 2001, the Luxottica Group acquired Sunglass Hut, paying US$653 million including debt and taking possession of 1,300 Sunglass Hut stores, 430 Sunglass Hut-Watch Station combination stores, and 228 stores that operated under either the Watch Station or Watch World banner.

Under Luxottica's control, Sunglass Hut repositioned its brand identity to emphasize the fashion of the sunglasses it sold. The repositioning began in 2003.

The Watch Station International chain was sold to Fossil Inc. in December 2007.

== Stores and locations ==
Sunglass Hut operates 2,000 retail outlets in 20 countries: 1,562 in North America, 157 in Australia, 44 in New Zealand, 15 in Asia, 123 in South Africa, 81 in the United Kingdom and Ireland, 33 in the Middle East, and 35 in India. As of 2015, it is the most common store in American shopping malls.

Sunglass Hut store types include normal retail stores and shopping centre kiosks, retailers in airports, hotels and outlet centres, and premium "global" stores. Sunglass Hut has entered into a partnership with Macy's to open stores within their department stores. In 2024 they began opening locations in Bass Pro Shops.

Sunglass Hut stores have opened in Australia, China, Thailand, Lebanon, India, the United Arab Emirates, Czech Republic, Bahrain and Saudi Arabia. In 2011, they continued to grow within Central and South America, opening up stores in Mexico and Brazil.

== Photo Gallery ==
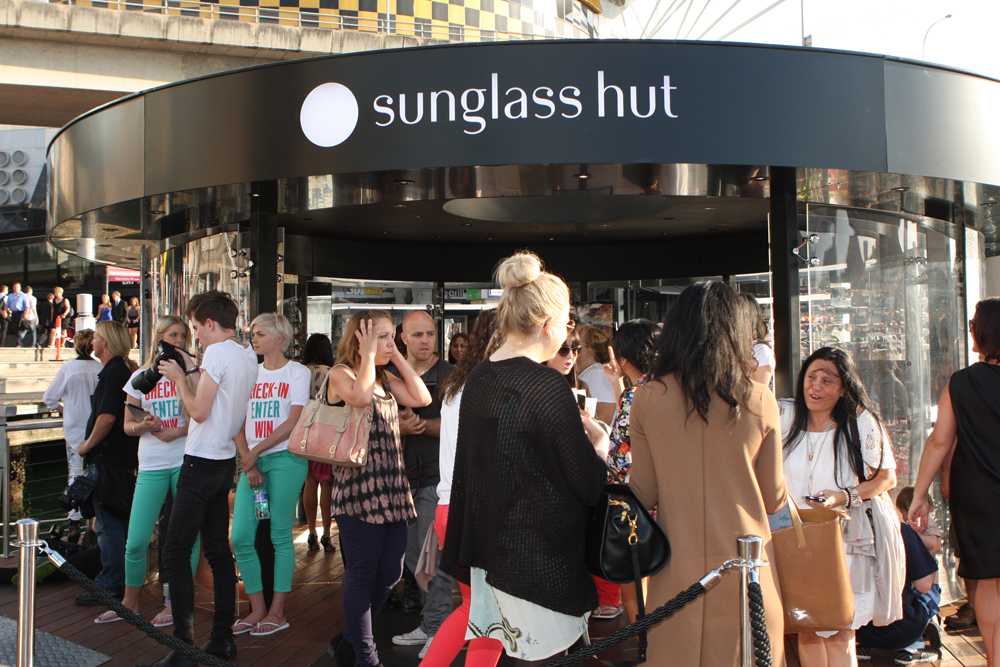
Sunglass Hut kiosk in Sydney

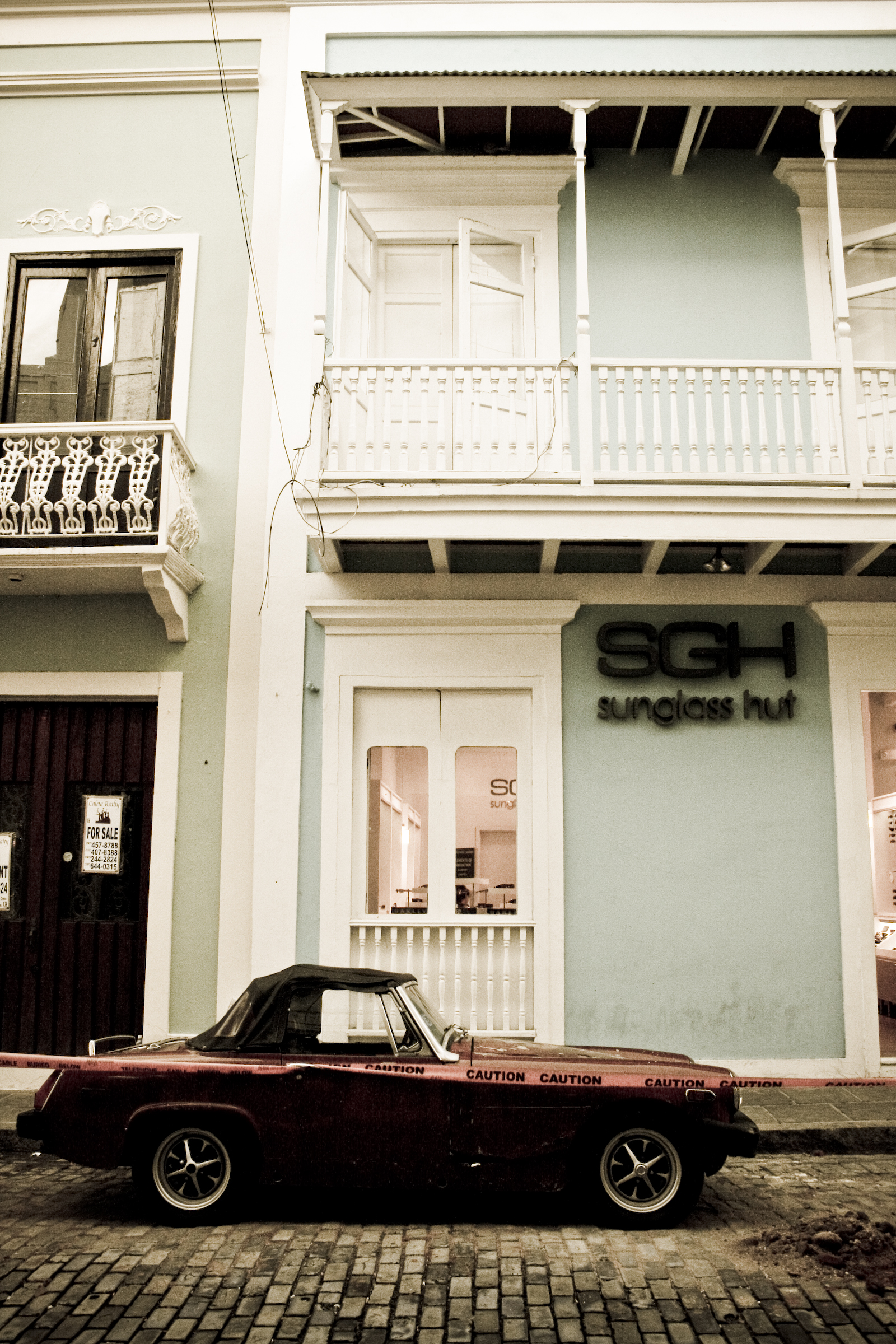
SGH Logo storefront in Old San Juan, Puerto Rico

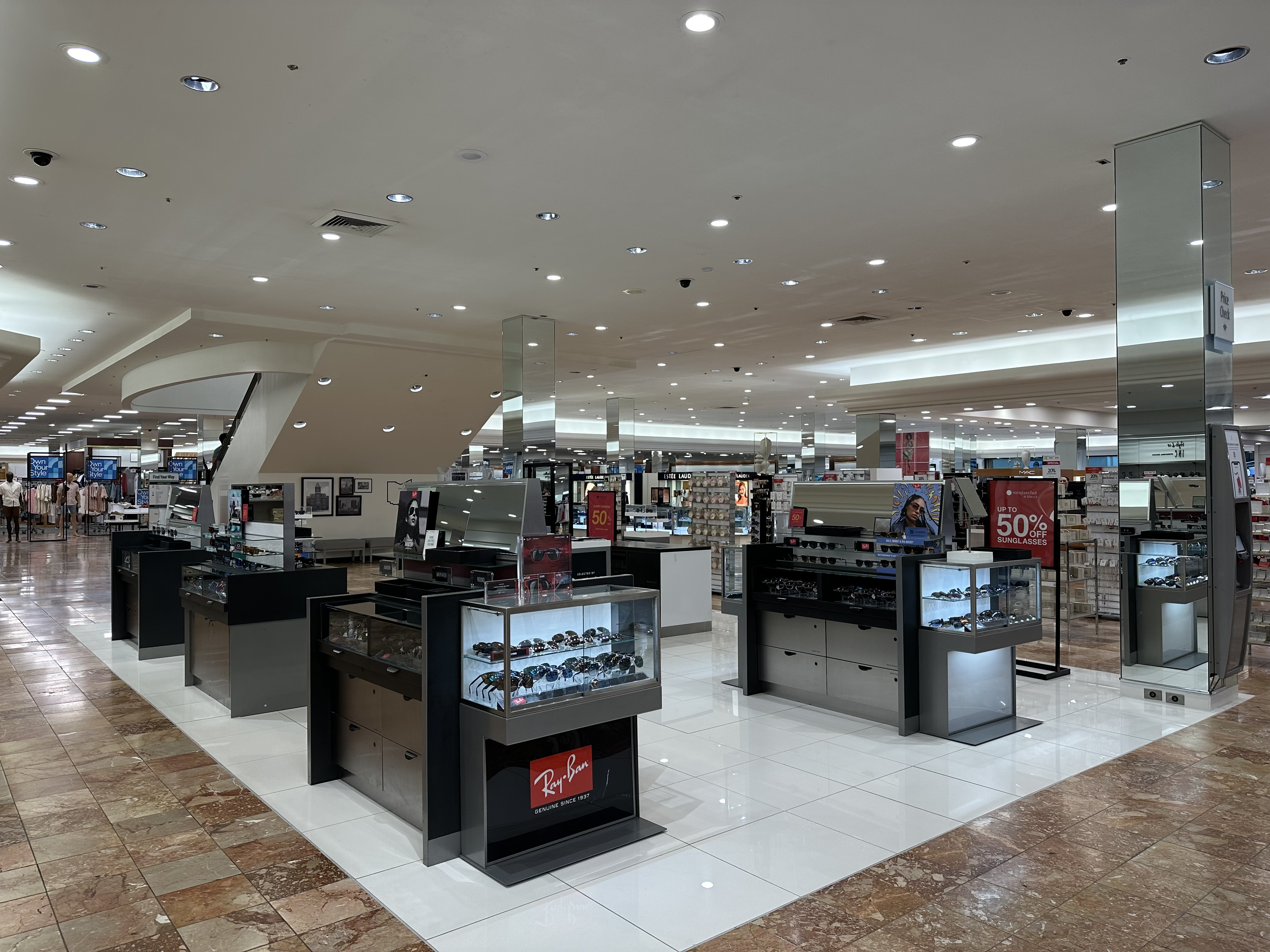
Sunglass Hut location inside of Macy's at Southern Park Mall

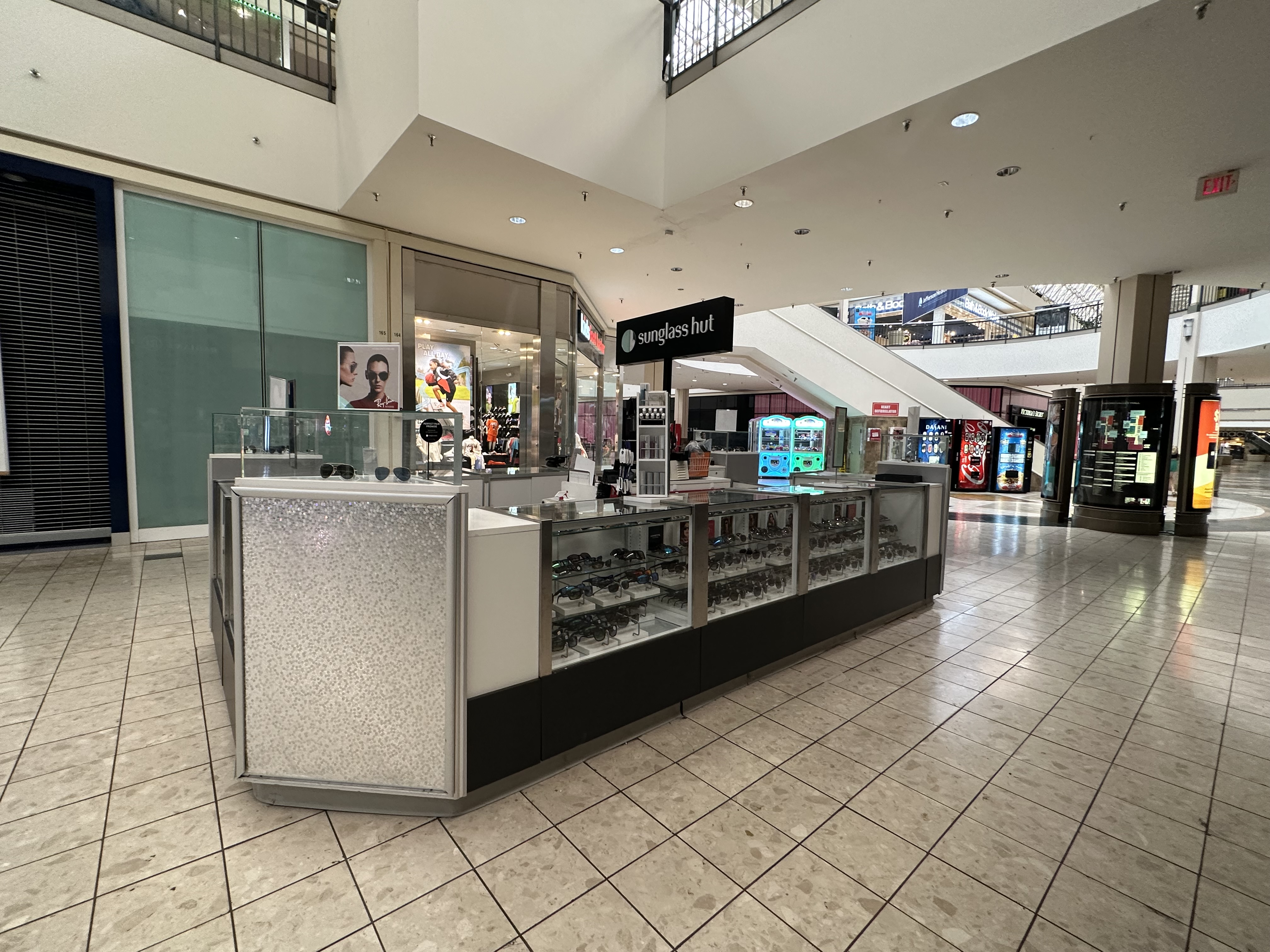
Sunglass Hut kiosk inside of Oxford Valley Mall

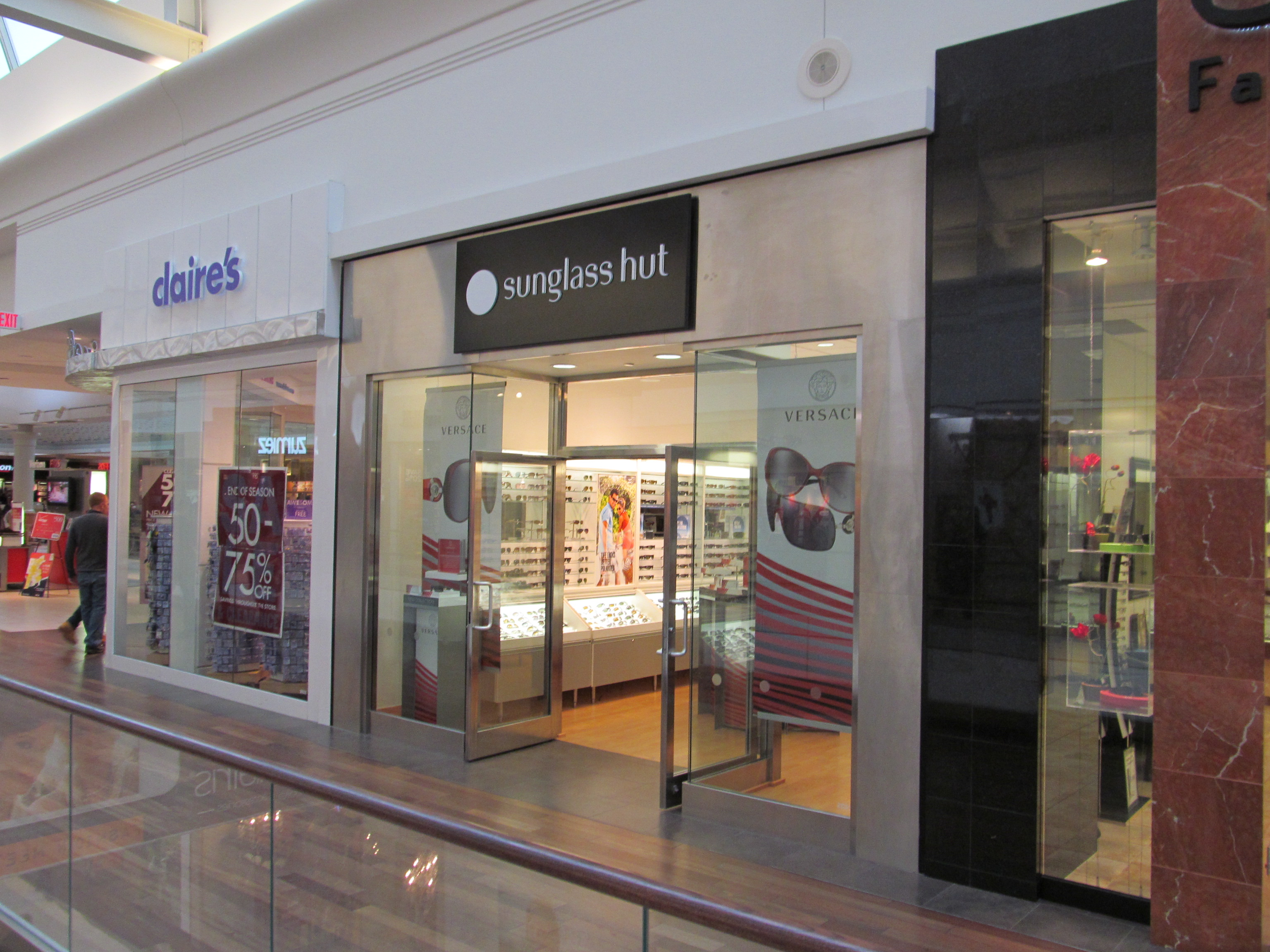
Sunglass Hut inside of the Natick Mall
