= Essilor =

French-based optics company

Essilor International
- Type: Subsidiary
- Traded as: Euronext Paris: ESS
- Industry: Medical equipment
- Founded: 1849 (as Essel); 1 January 1972 (as Essilor)
- Headquarters: Charenton-le-Pont, France
- Key people: Anatole Temkine; René Grandperret; Bernard Maitenaz; Xavier Fontanet; Hubert Sagnières
- Products: Corrective lenses; sun and readers eyeglasses; ophthalmic equipment and instruments
- Brands: Varilux, Clearly, Eyebuydirect, Foster Grant, Vision Source, Xiamen Yarui Optical (50%)
- Number of employees: 69,000 (2020)
- Parent: EssilorLuxottica (2018–present)
- Website: essilor.com

Essilor International is a French multinational corporation specialized in the design, manufacture and sale of ophthalmic lenses, optical equipment and instruments. It is the world's largest manufacturer of ophthalmic lenses. Founded in 1972 out of the merger of two French companies operating in the sector, Essel and Silor, it is headquartered in Charenton-le-Pont, near Paris. Since October 2018, it is a subsidiary of EssilorLuxottica which arose out of a merger between Essilor and the Italian eyewear corporation Luxottica.

In January 2017, Essilor announced a merger with Luxottica, in which Essilor would acquire the latter while Luxottica executive chairman Leonardo Del Vecchio would become co-executive chairman of the newly formed holding company, EssilorLuxottica. On 1 October 2018, the new entity was born, resulting in a combined market capitalization of approximately €57 billion.

== History ==
=== 1849–1972: Essel and Silor ===
Essel (Société des Lunetteries) was founded in 1849 (then-called L'Association Fraternelle des Ouvriers Lunetteries) as a small network of eyeglass assembly workshops in Paris. It expanded in the late 19th and early 20th centuries by acquiring factories in nearby Parisian neighborhoods and Eastern France. Essel soon added frame design and trade to its activities. In 1955 Essel launched a frame design, Nylor, that is still used today. The Nylor system introduced thin nylon that surrounds the lens and is fixed to the frame's higher branch. Essel's breakthrough came in 1959 with the invention of Varilux, the first ophthalmic progressive lens.

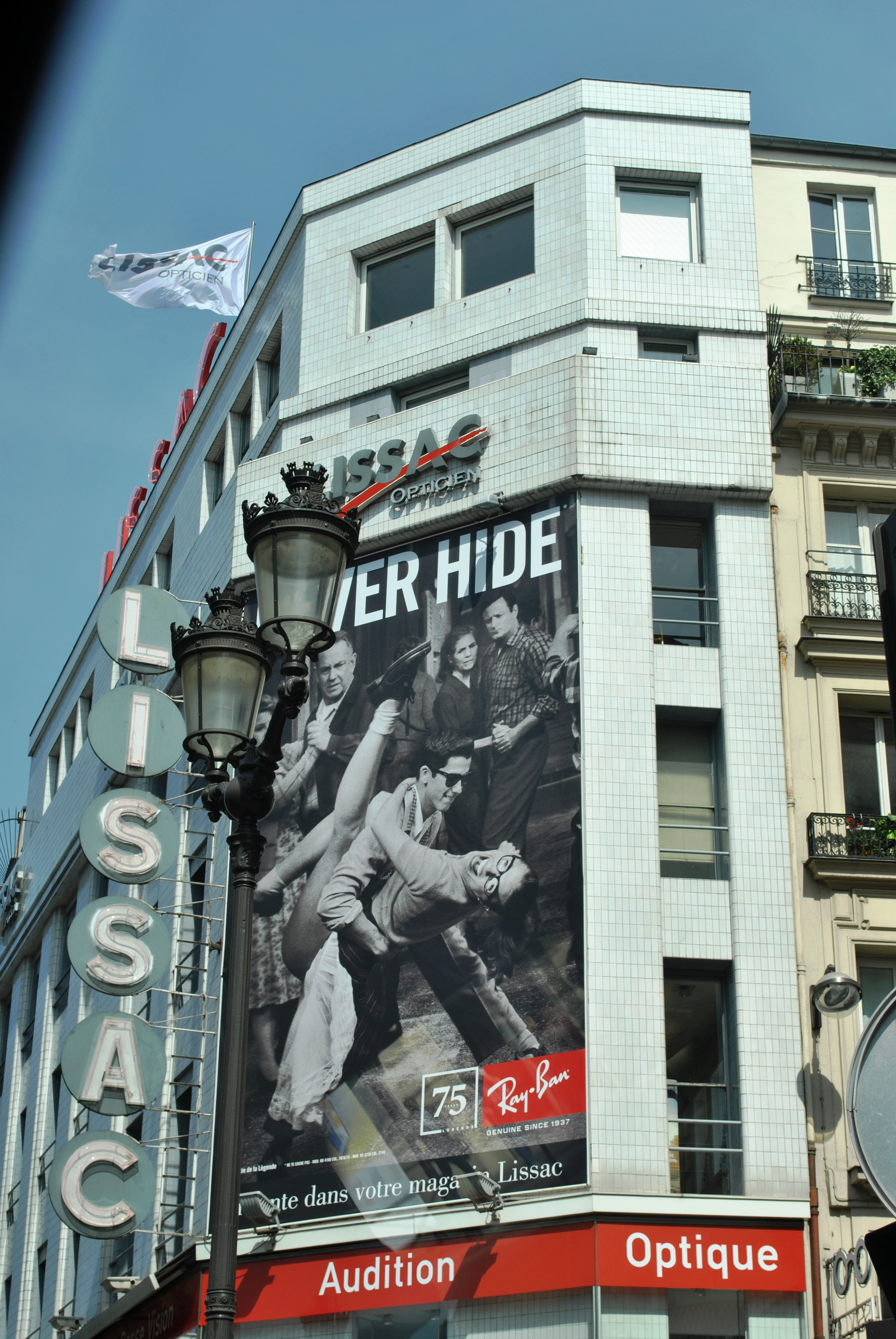
Original Lissac store in Paris

Silor (Société Industrielle de Lunetterie et d'Optique Rationnelle) first started under the name Lissac in 1931 as a retailer of ophthalmic lenses and frames before becoming a lens manufacturer. In 1959, the same year Essel invented the progressive lens, Lissac made a discovery of its own: the Orma 1000 lens, made from a lightweight material.

=== 1972–1979: Creation of Essilor ===
After many years as rivals, Essel and Silor merged on 1 January 1972 to form Essilor, then the world's third-largest ophthalmic optical firm. Its first year of existence was marked by the creation of Valoptec, a non-trading company composed of stockholder managers who held half the company's capital stock, and the purchase of Benoist-Bethiot, a French lens manufacturer specializing in progressive lenses.

In the mid-1970s, Essilor focused on becoming a true optical group specializing in plastic progressive lenses. Many subsidiary activities were first sold off, but in 1974 Essilor fused Benoist-Bethiot with Guilbert-Routit, creating the subsidiary BBGR. Essilor began its transformation from mainly an exporting company to an international company by opening a manufacturing plant in the United Kingdom, and acquiring manufacturing plants in the United States, Ireland and the Philippines. In 1975, the company was listed on the stock exchange. The innovations by Essel and Silor led to the Varilux Orma's launch in 1976.

=== 1980–1989: International growth ===
The 1980s began with intensified competition. Essilor purchased four new plants in four years, in Mexico, Puerto Rico, Brazil and Thailand. In France, new instruments facilitated automation of the manufacturing process. Many distributors were acquired or merged with Essilor in Europe (Norway, Portugal) and Asia (Burma, Indonesia, Japan, Malaysia, Singapore, Taiwan and Vietnam).

In the United States, all subsidiaries were brought together under the Essilor of America umbrella. This global network allowed Essilor to launch a new Varilux lens, the VMD, in Europe and the United States.

=== 1990–1999: Partnerships ===
Essilor has gradually withdrawn its frames business to focus on corrective lenses. It has launched a coating, Crizal, that provides lenses with resistance to scratches, reflections and stains. Essilor partnered with PPG of the United States to develop Transitions, a technology that allows lenses to become darker or lighter depending on the intensity of ambient light. With the acquisition of Gentex, Essilor also launched the polycarbonate Airwear lens, a lightweight, unbreakable material.

=== 2000–2009 ===
In 2007 Essilor launched the Essilor Vision Foundation in the USA. This organization was created to run tests in schools to detect vision problems. Essilor Vision Foundation provides the followup care and glasses to children in need.

In 2008 Essilor acquired the Swiss company Satisloh, a manufacturer of prescription laboratory equipment.

In 2010, Essilor acquired 50% of the kibbutz-based Shamir Optical Industry. Shamir took advantage of Essilor's worldwide distribution network to develop its activity by launching new products.

=== 2010–2016: Diversification ===
In 2010 Essilor acquired FGX International, an American company whose brands include Foster Grant. In 2011, Essilor acquired 50% of the Chinese company Wanxin Optical. The growth drivers for the Chinese market are the aging population and the increase of reimbursement for eye care. The 40th anniversary of the merger between Essel and Silor was in July 2012, an occasion to highlight their contributions and improvements on technologies. As of September 2012, Essilor has been involved in the Special Olympics for 10 years, providing almost 100,000 free eyeglasses to the athletes. In May 2013, Safilo and Essilor agreed on a 10-year licensing deal allowing Essilor to use Safilo's Polaroid brand for polarized lenses. In July 2013, Essilor bought 51% of Transitions Optical's stakes from PPG Industries. Essilor will eventually hold 100% of Transitions Optical. The deal was closed in 2014, and aims to develop Essilor's leadership in lenses that adapt to changing light. In March 2014, Essilor announced the acquisition of the Canadian online distributor Coastal.com, which rebranded as Clearly.ca in 2015. Essilor reinforced its presence online, adding Coastal.com to its online subsidiaries, such as MyOnlineOptical, FramesDirect and Eyebuydirect.

In 2014, Essilor won four awards at the First Edition of the Vision-X VP Awards. Its Varilux S Series won Most Popular Lens (Progressive), and the Transitions Signature VII won Most Popular Lens (Best Value). Its Crizal Forte UV and Mr Blue won Most Popular Lens Coating/Value Add and Best Value Enhancer (Lab). In 2015, Essilor International's U.S. subsidiary acquired Vision Source, a service network of independent optometrists, from Brazos Equity Partners LLC for an undisclosed amount. By 19 March 2016 the company had a share value of 23,564 million euros, distributed in 216,477,934 shares.

In March 2016 the company bought the UK online contacts retailer VisionDirect UK, adding to many online eyewear brands Essilor already owns. On 16 August 2016, Essilor International also completed the acquisition of MyOptique Group Ltd (parent company of Eyewearbrands, German-based Lensbest and 4care, Nordic and UK-operating VisionDirect [previously Lensbase and LensOn, and UK-based glasses e-retailer pioneers Glasses Direct and the Sunglasses Shop) for an estimated £120 million. Founded by entrepreneur Jamie Murray Wells in Wiltshire in 2004, MyOptique has an estimated active customer base of one million and an annual turnover of £57 million. As such, Essilor aimed to broaden its Central European online footprint and further diversify.

=== 2018: Merger with Luxottica ===
In January 2017, Essilor agreed to merge with Luxottica, subject to regulatory permission and competition conditions.

Throughout, Luxottica faced allegations of unfair operating practices, including the abuse of market dominance to artificially inflate prices and also restrict competition via monopolisation. In March 2018, the merger of Essilor and Luxottica received formal clearance from the United States Federal Trade Commission and European Trade Commission without qualifying or prerequisite conditions. A new holding company, EssilorLuxottica, was formally created on 1 October 2018, resulting in combined market capitalization of approximately €57 billion.

== Activity and distribution ==
In 2020, about 88.8% of Essilor's turnover came from the sale of ophthalmic lenses and optical instruments, 8.9% driven by sunglasses and readers and 2.3% from other activities, such as equipment sales.

Essilor operates a worldwide network of production plants, prescription laboratories, and distribution centers that supply corrective lenses, glasses, and sunglasses to opticians, optical chains, and consumers (via e-retailers it owns and/or operates directly).

=== Scientific and technical heritage ===
Essilor manages a collection of patents and objects related to its history and collaborates with several optics-related institutions. It offered the Essilor–Pierre Marly collection (one of the world's largest optical instrument and eyewear collections, consisting of about 2,500 items collected by Marly, a celebrity optician who operated in the second half of the 20th century) to the Musée de la lunette. The collection includes medieval spectacles, bourgeois lorgnettes, walking sticks with optical systems, French actress Sarah Bernhardt's lorgnettes, the daughter of Louis XV's [Victoire de France] glasses, and the iconic white plastic Courrèges Slit (a futuristic pair of sunglasses modelled upon a 2000-year old Arctic Inuit design, utilising carved slivers of whalebone, slit horizontally, to provide anti-glare eye protection). In 2008, Essilor signed a partnership with Le CNAM/PATSTEC to join the Mission nationale de sauvegarde du patrimoine scientifique et technique contemporain (National Mission for the Safeguarding of Contemporary Scientific and Technological Heritage).

== Eyewear and lens brands ==
- Essilor
  - Varilux – Brand of premium progressive addition lenses
  - Crizal – Industry-leading anti-reflective coating for lenses
  - Eyezen – Digitally surfaced lens marketed towards users of electronic devices
  - Xperio – Polarized sunglass lens
  - Optifog – Fog resistant lens technology
  - Stellest – Lens targeted towards young children, designed to slow the progression of myopia.
  - Orma – Essilor's branding of the CR-39 lens material.
- Transitions – #1 selling brand of photochromic lenses. Formerly a joint venture between Essilor and PPG.
- Foster Grant – American brand selling non-prescription reading glasses; acquired from FGX in 2010.
- Bolon – Chinese ophthalmic frame brand.
- Molsion
- Kodak Lens – Mid-range lens and coating brand, produced under license from Eastman Kodak. Less premium than Essilor's flagship Varilux and Crizal products.

== Online retail stores ==
- Clearly
- Eyebuydirect
- Framesdirect
- Lensway
- My Optique Group
- Vision Direct

== Research and development ==
Essilor invests over €200m each year in research and innovation, three times more than the rest of the industry combined. In Singapore, the Centre for Innovation and Technology and the International Vision Academy are housed in a facility called Kallang Bahru. In 2011, Pierre and Marie Curie University accredited Essilor wearer tests. In 2018, Essilor was ranked for the 8th consecutive year on Forbes's list of the world's most innovative companies. It is the third French company in the ranking.

=== Innovation ===
Essilor has about 450 researchers working at its five R&D facilities: one in Ireland dedicated to photochromic lenses and four Innovation and Technologies Centers in Europe (Créteil, France), the United States (Dallas) and Asia (China and Singapore). The facilities develop new products and work to identify and forge the best possible research partnerships.

In 2010, Essilor created Shopper Labs, renamed Essilor Companion™ Lab in 2020, experimental stores for opticians to support their practices.

In 2018, the Silmo international optics tradeshow honored Essilor's Vision-R™800 in the Material/Equipment category and BBGR's BLUV® XPERT, in the Vision category.

In 2018 Forbes named Essilor one of the world's 100 "Most Innovative Companies", ranked 52nd; a marked increase from 2017 (68th). Every year since 2010, Essilor has figured among the top 100 publicly traded companies investors identify as having the highest innovation potential.

==== Virtual reality ====
Essilor's research department particularly concentrates on the combined progress of two complementary disciplines: optics and physiology, with particular recourse to virtual reality, a simulation tool that makes it possible to perceive and interact in 3D in a multi-sensory way.

Researchers today use a virtual visualization system, equipped with algorithms and modeling Essilor developed to explore new optical solutions that can be tested directly on wearers. This simulator makes it possible to vary the properties of the lenses tested, study optical effects and immediately gauge wearer satisfaction. To do so, a magnetic sensor records a subject's head movements and images that show the eyes' exact viewpoint 120 times per second. After testing, the results are used to fine-tune the lenses' performance. In 2008, the Varilux Ipseo New Edition was designed using Essilor's Virtual Reality system.

=== Partnerships ===
Essilor has a number of partnerships with universities and other scientific and technical communities.

The firm participated in the Vision Institute (Institut de la Vision de Paris), a research center on ocular pathology inaugurated in 2008. In 2015 the firm, the Vision Institute and the Sorbonne University in Paris created Silversight, a joint public-private research program on healthy visual ageing.

In 2001, the firm began a collaboration with the University of Montréal on perception and ageing. In 2003 this became the NSERC-Essilor industrial Chair.

In 2012 the firm was one of six industry partners along with the Natural Sciences and Engineering Research Council of Canada (NSERC) to create a research chair in coatings engineering at the Ecole Polytechnique de Montréal.

In 2013, the firm established a joint research center in China with Wenzhou Medical University to investigate the progression of myopia, with a focus on the evolution of children's myopia.

In 2015 Essilor and the CNRS LAAS signed a research partnership. A multidisciplinary team of researchers and engineers will research lenses and glasses with active and connected functions.

== Brands ==
=== Varilux ===
Varilux is a brand of progressive lenses for people with presbyopia-correcting their vision at near and far distances and in between. Engineer Bernard Maitenaz invented the lens and in 1959 it was the first progressive lens available on the market.

==== Crizal Prevencia ====
Crizal Prevencia, launched in 2013, is a lens that lets in beneficial light and filters out blue-violet and UV rays.

In 2014, Essilor won a Fibre Innovation Award for Crizal Prevencia at an event at the Paris Pierre and Marie Curie University celebrating advances in technology that benefit society.

=== Eyezen ===
In 2015 Essilor launched Eyezen lenses, designed for people's increasingly connected lives. Its research had determined that the reading distance of 40 cm that had been used as a standard for lens development had decreased to an average 33 cm when using digital tools.

=== Transitions ===
Transitions Optical, Inc., specializing in photochromic lenses, started as a joint venture between PPG Industries and Essilor International S.A. in 1990. In 2009, it launched the first commercially viable photochromic shield for motorcycle helmets. In 2010, it introduced Transitions XTRActive lenses, with technology that allows the lenses to activate behind the windshield.

In April 2014, Essilor acquired the entire stake of PPG in Transitions.

In 2018, Essilor announced that Transitions Optical had partnered with Johnson & Johnson Vision to make the light-adaptive photochromic technology available in a contact lens for the first time. Later that year, Time magazine named Acuvue Oasys with Transitions Light Intelligent technology the best invention of 2018.

=== Vision Direct ===
Vision Direct, formerly Vision Direct Group Ltd, is an online optical retailer that sells contact lenses, solutions and eye care products. Founded in 2004 as Optical Partners plc (unlisted), a small High Street retail business headed by Michael Kraftman, the company is based in the United Kingdom but also operates in the United States, Ireland, France, Italy, Spain, Netherlands and Belgium. In 2014 it rebranded itself from GetLenses.

In 2015 Vision Direct ran a £2 m TV advertising campaign. Vision Direct's 2015 Christmas campaign featured a short sighted pug named Gizmo, who had been having trouble with his glasses.

In 2016 Vision Direct was acquired by Essilor, putting it under the same ownership as Coastal / Clearly.

== Corporate social responsibility ==
=== Initiatives ===
The Essilor Vision Foundation was founded in 2007 in the United States to help eliminate poor vision among children.

In 2012, Essilor created the Vision Impact Institute, which manages a database of research and scientific studies on visual health and raises awareness of the benefits of corrected vision to guide public health policy decisions. One of the first research papers shared by the Institute showed that the global economy loses $227 billion every year from lost productivity caused by poor vision. In 2016, the firm contributed to the EYElliance report "Bridging the visual divide", at the World Economic Forum, calling for more financial support for access to eyeglasses.

In 2013, the firm launched the Eye Mitra program in India to increase access to vision care for underserved populations.

=== Partnerships ===
==== FIA ====
Essilor and the Fédération Internationale de l'Automobile (FIA) signed a three-year partnership that will promote good vision as a key pillar of road safety through awareness campaigns and underline the importance of regular sight tests to ensure safe driving.

==== The Jubilee Trust Fund ====
In April 2018 the Queen Elizabeth Diamond Jubilee Trust announced the creation of the Vision Catalyst Fund to bring eye care to people in the Commonwealth. Essilor is a partner in the fund.

== Key figures ==
=== Financial information ===
Numbers in millions of euros
Year	2002	2003	2004	2005	2006	2007	2008	2009	2010	2011	2012	2013	2014	2015	2016	2017
Revenue	2,138	2,116	2,203	2,424	2,690	2,908.1	3,074.4	3,268.0	3,891.6	4,190	4,989	5,065	5,670	6,716	7,115	7,402
Net income	182	200	244	287	328	366.7	382.4	394.0	462.0	506	584	594	642	757	813	833
Equity funds	1,212	1,206	1,341	1,681	1,881	2,156	2,351	2,713	3,001	3,458	3,921	4,041	5,260	6,092	6,504	6,688
Number of employees:	23,269	23,607	24,793	26,534	29,288	31,534	34,320	34,759	42,704	48,700	52,600	55,000	58,000	55,000	63,676	67,000

== See also ==
- Hubert Sagnières
