= Hubert Sagnières =

French businessman

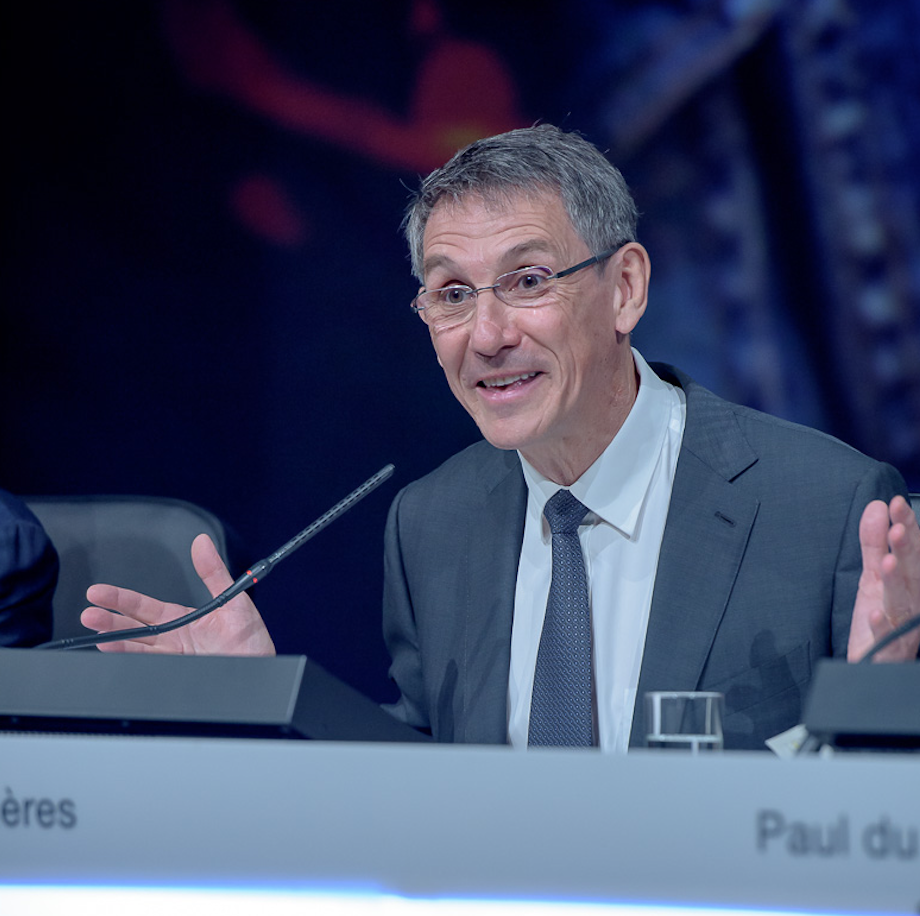
- Born: 10 May 1955 (age 71); Vienne, France
- Education: Lycée Sainte-Geneviève
- Alma mater: École centrale de Lille; INSEAD
- Title: Executive vice-chairman EssilorLuxottica; Chairman Essilor International

Hubert Sagnières (born 10 May 1955 in Vienne, France), is a business executive of French and Canadian nationality. He was chairman and CEO of Essilor International from 2012 to 2018 and became executive vice-chairman of EssilorLuxottica while keeping his role of chairman of Essilor International when Essilor merged with Luxottica in 2018.

Sagnières is also known for his enthusiasm for polar expeditions and his interest in the history of French explorations.

Hubert Sagnières is an explorer and long-distance traveller. He has carried out more than twenty-five polar expeditions in the Arctic, travelling on skis while pulling his sledge or assisted by a team of dogs. In Oceania, his journeys have led him to the remote tribes of Borneo, Siberut, and Sumatra.

Sagnières is also an author of illustrated historical works published by Flammarion. An explorer and a specialist in the great polar and maritime expeditions, he created the editorial concept “Their Images and Their Words”, which brings together excerpts from explorers,accounts, original iconography, and route maps to offer a visual and documentary approach to exploration. He is also known for donating all of his author royalties to organisations dedicated to humanitarian action and to supporting exploration and solidarity initiatives.

In 2023, he published a book on French explorers from 1714 to 1854: »Daring French Explorations », whose royalties were entirely donated to Karuna-Shechen, the foundation created by Matthieu Ricard. In 2025, he released a second work devoted to Arctic expeditions: »For Glory,not Gold ». The book brings together more than four hundred illustrations, previously unpublished maps, and expedition-journal excerpts, and its royalties are donated to La Guilde (la-guilde.org).

== Biography ==
=== Education ===
Hubert Sagnières graduated with a degree in Economics and a master's degree from École Centrale de Lille and obtained an MBA from INSEAD.

=== Professional debut ===
In 1980, Sagnières moved to Tahiti in French Polynesia and joined Plastiserd LLC, eventually becoming the managing director. From 1986 to 1987 he then held the position of assistant general manager of Europe at Valois in Paris. In 1988, Sagnières became the chief executive officer of Homespace, based in Paris.

=== Essilor ===
==== Career at Essilor ====
Sagnières joined Essilor in 1989 as president of International Marketing in the optical lens division. In 1991 he left Europe for Montreal, Canada where he was appointed to president of Essilor Canada, followed by president of Essilor Laboratories of America in 1997. In 1998, he was given the position of president of Essilor of America, based in Dallas, Texas. In 2006, he acquired more responsibility through his position as president of Essilor Europe and North America.

In 2008, he was named chief operating officer of the Group, and on 1 January 2010, Hubert Sagnières became chief executive officer of Essilor International. In 2011, the Group indicated that it would return to Essilor's traditional mode of governance by regrouping the functions of chairman and CEO.

On 24 November 2011, Essilor's board of directors appointed Sagnières as chairman and CEO of the Group from 2 January 2012, succeeding Xavier Fontanet.

==== At the head of Essilor: strategy, performance and positions ====
Once at the head of Essilor, Sagnières expanded the scope of activities of the group towards sunglasses, vision care protection and prevention and online sales, deployed Essilor all across the United States, and accelerated the development of Essilor in Asia, Africa and Latin America.

In 2013, he was named "second most performing CAC 40 CEO" by Challenges magazine.

In March 2014, following the French government's announcement of a cap on eyeglass reimbursements, Sagnières expressed his concern regarding the consequences for Essilor's industrial footprint and competitiveness in France along with risks to hinder access to vision solutions for French people.

==== Societal engagement ====
At the head of Essilor, Sagnières created a range of philanthropic entities and inclusive business programmes aimed at developing access to vision care all over the world and eliminating poor vision by 2050, in line with the Essilor Group's mission.

In 2007, he founded the Essilor Vision Foundation, based in Dallas, Texas. This foundation aims to improve the quality of eye examinations in schools, to provide care to children who can not afford them otherwise and to educate parents, teachers, and the general public about eye health. Sagnières remains a member of the board of the foundation.

Through Essilor, Sagnières supports the Vision Impact Institute, launched in March 2013. This Institute aims at collecting data about impaired vision and its socio-economic impact. Sagnières thus contributes to fostering synergies between the Vision Impact Institute, the Essilor Vision Foundation and Essilor International.

In April 2013, Sagnières created a new position at Essilor, chief mission officer, and appointed Jayanth Bhuvaraghan to develop initiatives aimed at "improving lives by improving sight".

In May 2013, Sagnières created the Corporate Social Responsibility committee as part of the board of directors at Essilor.

In February 2015, he announced the launch of the "Vision For Life" programme at Essilor, administered by two non-profit organizations and committed to fund 30 million euros to associations in relation to visual health. In March 2018, Vision For Life was allocated an additional 19 million euros.

He is committed to the Eye Mitra programme and participates in its annual convention since its creation in 2013. The Eye Mitra programme consists in training young primary vision care providers to bring visual healthcare to those living in remote areas of India. Over the years, the programme has been successfully expanded to other countries such as Bangladesh and Indonesia.

Sagnières' work at the head of Essilor also includes the launch (in 2015) of "Vision Ambassadors", a programme aimed at providing basic eye care to people living in underserved areas in developing countries, and participating (together with governments, development agencies, other private companies and eye health practitioners) in Our Children's Vision, which aims to test the vision of 50 million children worldwide by 2020 (April 2013).

In April 2018, Sagnières announced Essilor's partnership with the Vision Catalyst Fund to provide ophthalmic lenses to 200 million people in the Commonwealth living below the poverty line.

In December 2018, Sagnières was present at the signature of the Letter of Intent between Essilor with the Royal Government of Bhutan and the Central Monastic Body to strengthen the country's vision care infrastructure. Essilor has pledged to provide 400,000 pairs of eyeglasses for free which will be distributed to all Bhutanese citizens in need and help in strengthening the capacity of health professionals on vision care through the help of training programs and tools.

During a panel discussion on the sidelines of the 74th Session of the United Nations General Assembly on 24 September 2019, Sagnières presented Essilor's evidence-based report, which includes analytical support from McKinsey & Company and quantifies the scale of the "uncorrected poor vision crisis" as well as relevant solutions. According to the report, a total investment of $14 billion over the next 30 years is required to eliminate uncorrected poor vision by 2050.

==== Employee shareholding ====
Hubert Sagnières has developed employee shareholding at Essilor as it jumped from 21% in 2016 to over 67% by the end of 2019, making it one of the three French companies with the highest percentage of employee shareholders. Essilor's employee shareholding effort has been cited as an example by French President Emmanuel Macron several times.

==== Salary and compensation ====
In 2017, Sagnières received 2,140,000 € for salary and compensation for his positions at Essilor, as well as 50,000 performance shares accounting for 2.7 million euros.

=== EssilorLuxottica ===
From October 1, 2018, as part of the merger between Essilor and Luxottica, Sagnières has held the role of the executive vice-chairman of the new company EssilorLuxottica and remains chairman of Essilor.

Sagnières says he sees uniting Essilor and Luxottica as a way to develop the eyewear market "which is currently facing two key challenges—awareness and accessibility. There is a lack of awareness when it comes to bad vision. Secondly, there are not enough stores or access points where people can go and have their eyes checked or purchase eye-glasses, contact lenses and sunglasses."

== Writing ==
In 2023 Sagnières published a non-fiction book, Daring French Explorations 1714-1854, Trailblazing adventures around the world, Flammarion. The book proposes a series of extracts from the travel journals of the French explorers, as well as some 400 digitalized illustrations from the illustrators who embarked with them on their journey.

=== Awards ===
- Knight (Chevalier) of the Legion of Honour (2012).
- Fellow Member, The Explorers Club
- Honorary Fellow, Royal Canadian Geographical Society

== Others activities ==
=== Mandates outside of the Essilor Group ===
- China Europe International Business School (CEIBS), Member of the international advisory board;
- Suny college of optometry in New York, honorary doctorate.
