= Vision Source =

Optometric service network owned by EssilorLuxottica

- Company type: Limited partnership
- Industry: Eye care
- Founded: 1991; 34 years ago
- Founder: Glenn Ellisor, O.D.
- Headquarters: Kingwood, Houston, Texas, United States
- Key people: Amir Khoshnevis, OD (President)
- Website: visionsource.com

Vision Source is an optometric service network of independent optometrists headquartered in Kingwood, Houston, Texas, US, owned by EssilorLuxottica since 2015. The company was founded by Glenn Ellisor, O.D. in 1991.

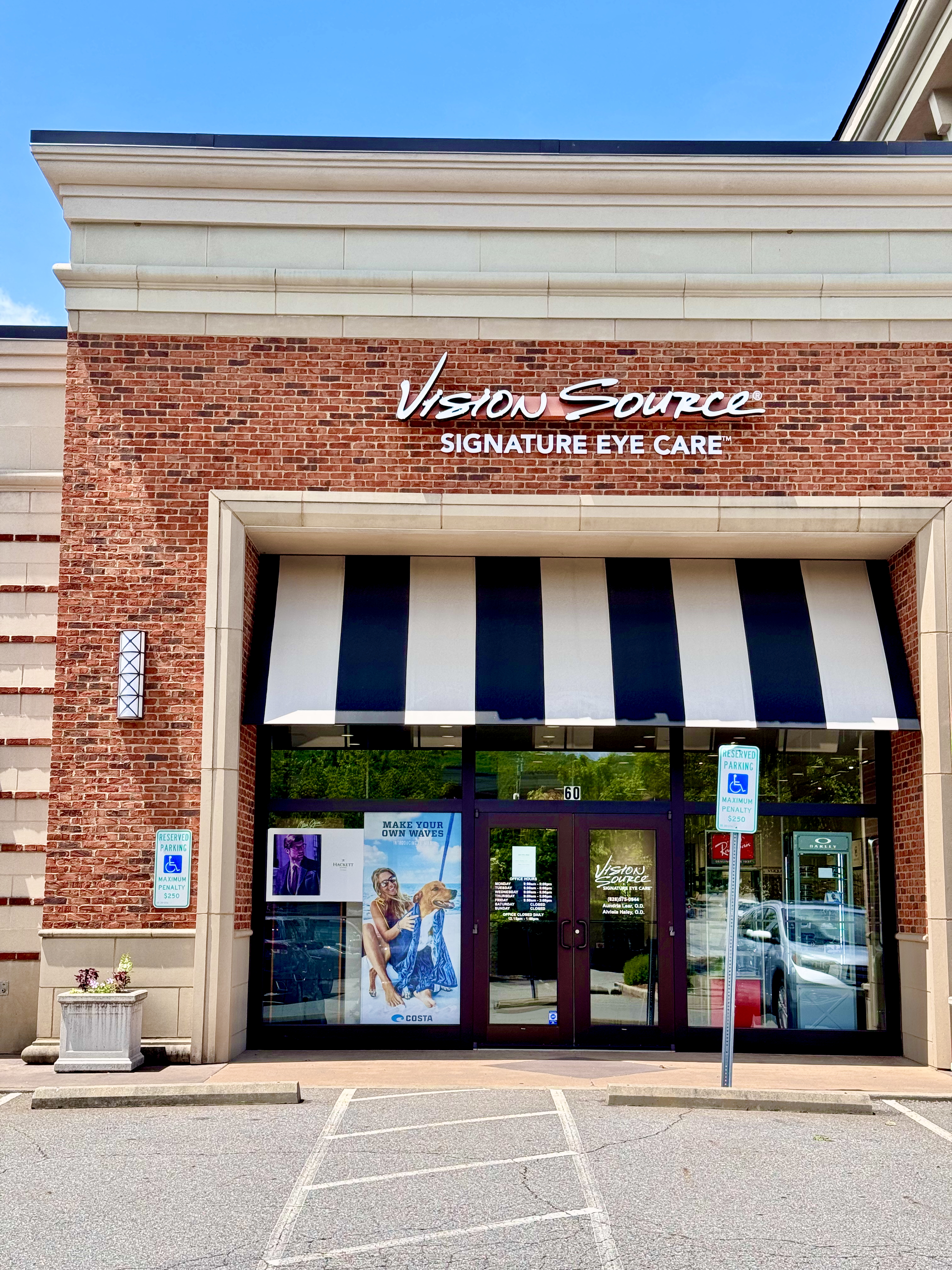
A Vision Source in Asheville, North Carolina

Vision Source is considered a franchisor in accordance to franchise law, and its members are franchisees, who own their respective practice. In 2024, Vision Source members reported a combined $3,000,000,000+ in retail sales, professional services, and managed vision benefits, making them the largest optical retailer in the U.S. for 9 straight years, ahead of Luxottica.

Optometrists pay Vision Source a fee based on the percentage of the practice's gross income. In exchange, Vision Source provides optometrists access to new technologies, practice management tools, marketing assistance, and supply chain programs.

Brazos Equity Partners LLC invested in Vision Source in 2011 to support the company's growth.

In 2015, the U.S. subsidiary of Essilor International acquired Vision Source from Brazos Equity Partners LLC for an undisclosed amount.
