= Pearle Vision =

International chain of eye care stores owned by EssilorLuxottica

- Type: Subsidiary
- Industry: Eye care
- Founded: 1961; 65 years ago
- Founder: Stanley Pearle
- Headquarters: Mason, Ohio, United States
- Products: Eyewear, glasses, sunglasses
- Parent: Grand Metropolitan (1985–1996); Cole National (1996–2004); Luxottica (2004–2018); EssilorLuxottica (2018-present)
- Website: https://www.pearlevision.com/en-us/

Pearle Vision is an American chain of eye care stores. It is one of the largest franchised optical retailers in North America. The company was acquired by Luxottica (which has since merged with Essilor to form EssilorLuxottica), an Italian eyewear company, in 2004. As of December 31, 2018, Pearle Vision operated 110 corporate stores and had 419 franchises throughout North America.

== History ==
Pearle Vision was founded as Pearle Optical in 1961 by optometrist Stanley Pearle, in Savannah, Georgia. Pearle found success by offering an optometrist and optician in the same store, providing customers with comprehensive eye care. By 1963, the company had expanded to 47 locations and went public under the name Opticks, Incorporated. There were over 100 locations by 1966. In 1968, Pearle sold his business to Will Ross Hospital Supply Company of Milwaukee but stayed on as CEO and a member of the board.

In 1971, Pearle purchased a 17-store optical chain owned by Robert Hillman and Larry Kohan, which focused on offering one-hour eyeglasses service. Hillman and Kohan stayed on and helped to expand Pearle Vision nationwide. Will Ross was acquired by G.D. Searle, a pharmaceutical firm based in Chicago, in 1973.

Pearle began franchising its stores in 1981. In 1984, it introduced its Managed Vision Care unit to provide vision care benefits to managed healthcare providers. By this time, the company had 800 Pearle Vision Centers in 39 states and more than 200 Texas State Optical stores. This amounted to 6% market share.

Pearle sold his stores to British conglomerate Grand Metropolitan in September 1985. The company established the Pearle Vision Foundation, a charity, in 1986. In 1987, Pearle acquired the 27-store chain Vision Express based in Kentucky.

Grand Met expanded Pearle Vision to more than 1,000 locations worldwide by 1990, but profits became elusive as the economy faltered and competition increased. A restructuring that eliminated 15% of the company's workforce at its Dallas headquarters helped to turn things around. It also introduced an incentives program for local managers to improve sales at their stores. By 1994, Pearle had dropped its number of US-based stores from 900 to 720. By May 1996, Pearle's Managed Vision Care had enrolled 1.2 million people.

In 1996, Grand Met sold the Pearle stores in the United States, Canada, and Puerto Rico to Cole National Corporation, which operated optical departments inside such retail stores as Sears, BJ's Wholesale Club and Target. In 1997, Cole National bought the 150-store NuVision chain in Michigan and converted them to the Pearle Vision name.

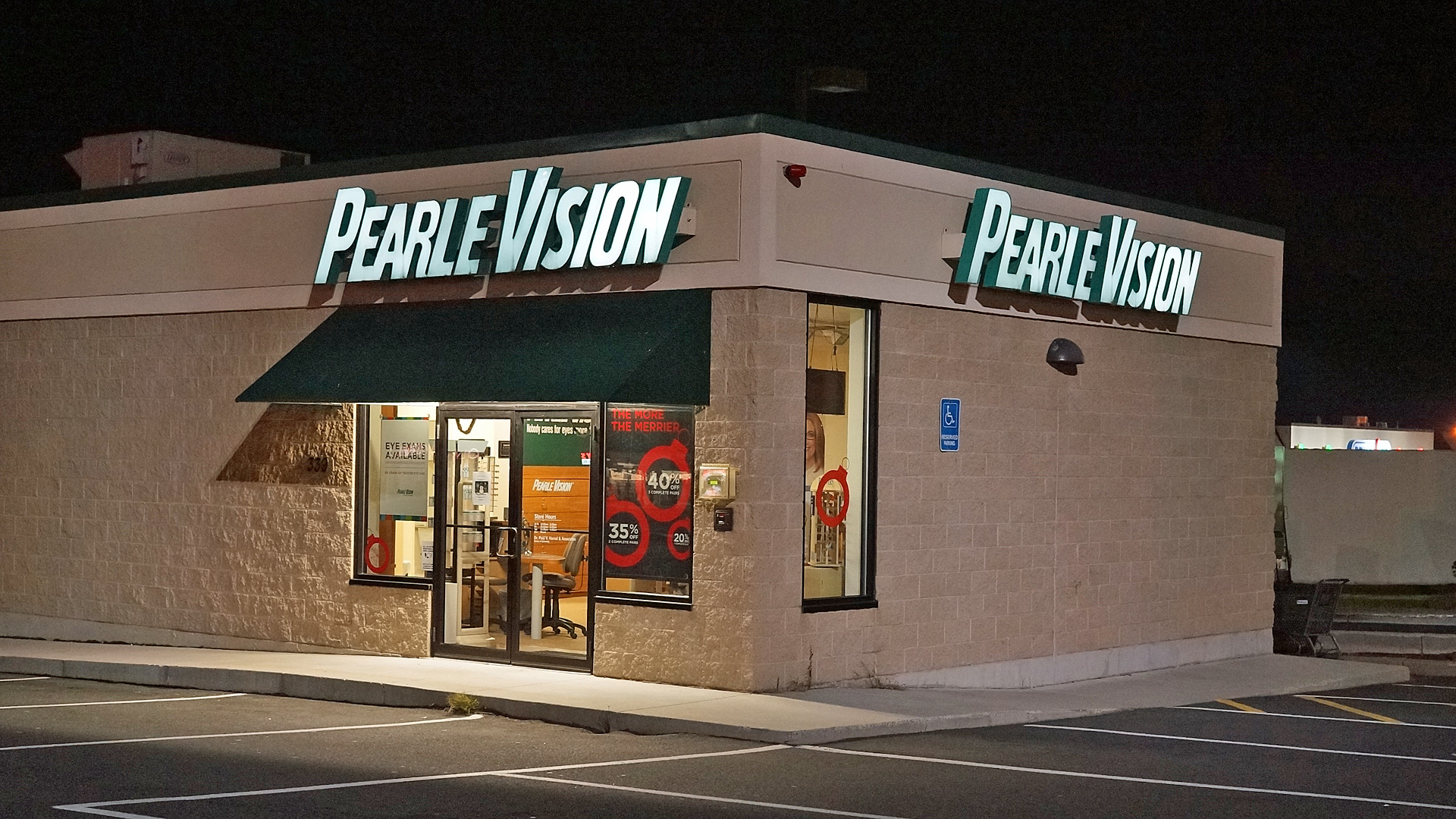
Pearle Vision store in Revere, Massachusetts

In 2003, Pearle introduced its PearleNation sub-brand intended to target teenage customers.

Luxottica, owner of LensCrafters, purchased Cole National in 2004 for $401 million. The deal brought together the two largest eyewear retailers in the United States.

Pearle died in 2011 at the age of 92.

By 2026, the company had 550 locations in 35 states, Canada, and the Caribbean. In June, Pearle Vision acquired its largest franchisee, bringing 90 stores under corporate control.

== Legal ==
In 2002, California's attorney general challenged Pearle Vision's practice of having both an optician and optometrist at the same location. The state's consumer protection laws consider this a conflict of interest.

However, the company argued that optometrists were employed by a health management organization called Pearle VisionCare, which is separate from Pearle Vision.

On June 12, 2006, the Supreme Court of California ruled that Pearle Vision had violated the law, and that its attempts to find a loophole through the Knox-Keene Health Care Service Plan Act of 1975 were unavailing.

== International ==
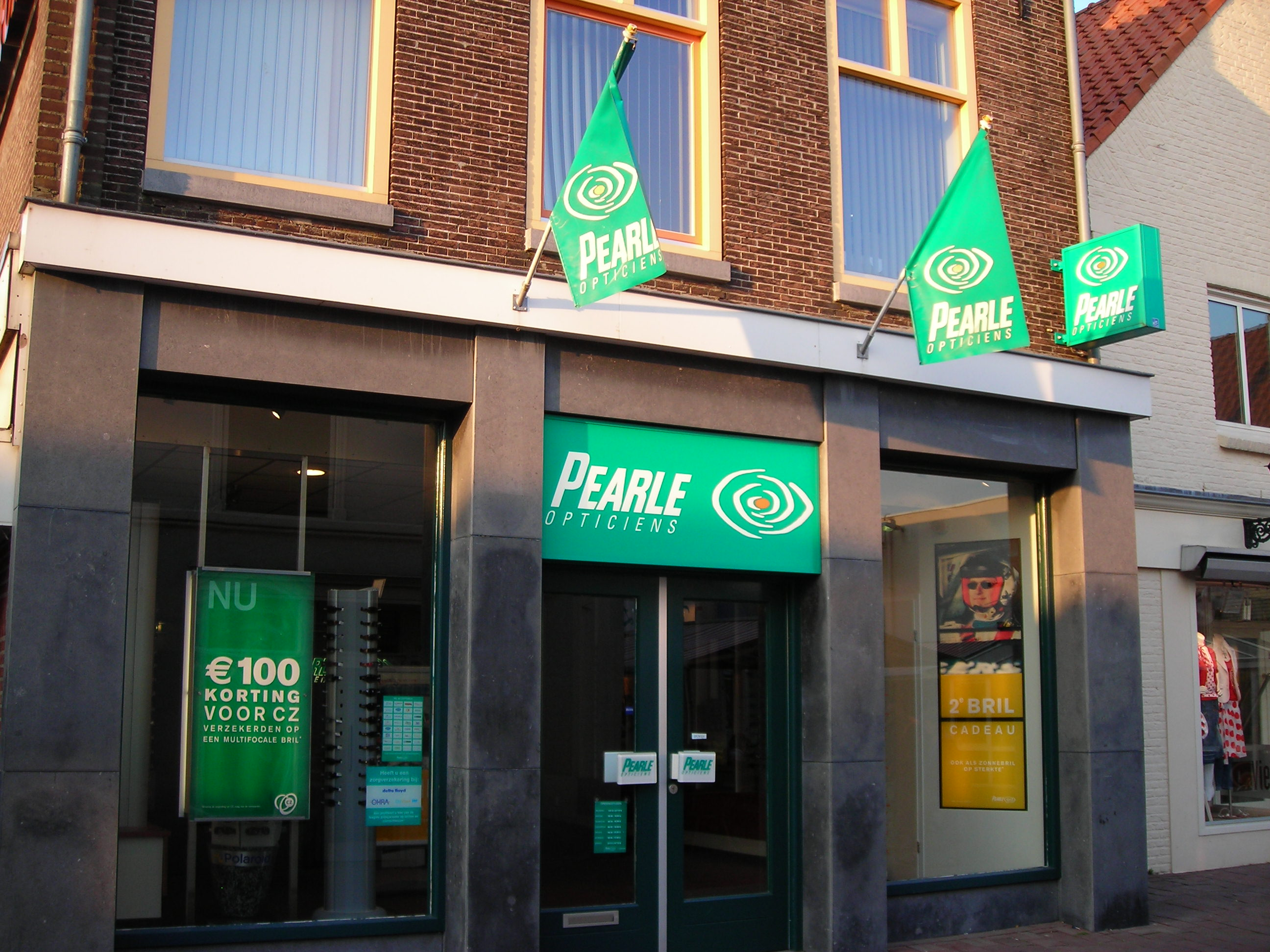
A photo of Pearle in Boxmeer, Netherlands

In November 1996, Pearle Vision sold its stores in the Netherlands to HAL Investments, creating Pearle Europe. HAL also bought the chain's Belgian stores and merged them into Pearle Benelux.

Following the acquisition of Cole National Corporation, Luxottica sold its share of Pearle Europe to HAL Holding NV for about $191 million. By this point, the company had 1,000 outlets in 11 European countries. HAL later merged Pearle Europe into GrandVision in 2011. EssilorLuxottica ultimately acquired GrandVision in 2021.
