= Luxottica =

Italian eyewear company

Luxottica Group S.p.A.
- Type: Subsidiary
- Traded as: BIT: LUX (2000–2017) NYSE: LUX (1990–2017)
- Industry: Eyewear manufacturing, luxury, eyewear manufacturing and wholesale distribution, eyewear retailing
- Founded: 1961; 65 years ago, in Agordo, Italy
- Founder: Leonardo Del Vecchio
- Headquarters: Milan, Italy
- Area served: Worldwide
- Key people: Francesco Milleri (deputy chairman and CEO)
- Products: Sunglasses, spectacle frames, prescription frames
- Services: Opticians, optical retail, sun retail
- Number of employees: 89,000 (2019)
- Parent: EssilorLuxottica (2018–present)
- Divisions: Ray-Ban, Persol, Oakley, LensCrafters, OPSM, Sunglass Hut, Apex by Sunglasshut, Eyemed, Pearle Vision, Sears Optical, Onesight, Target Optical
- Website: luxottica.com/en

Luxottica Group S.p.A. was an Italian eyewear multinational corporation headquartered in Milan. A merger with Essilor happened in January 2017 which made Luxottica a subsidiary of the French company Essilor. As a vertically integrated company, Luxottica designs, manufactures, distributes, and retails its eyewear brands through its own subsidiaries. It is the largest eyewear company in the world. It is, since October 2018, a subsidiary of EssilorLuxottica, which arose out of a merger between the Italian company and the French ophthalmic optics corporation Essilor.

Luxottica was founded in Agordo by Leonardo Del Vecchio in 1961 as a sunglasses manufacturer selling and branding under its own name. Del Vecchio quickly acquired numerous businesses in the pursuit of vertical integration, buying distribution companies rapidly and signing its first designer licensing agreement with Giorgio Armani. In 1990, the company listed American depositary receipts on the New York Stock Exchange where it traded until 2017.

Luxottica retails its products through stores that it owns, predominantly LensCrafters, Sunglass Hut, Pearle Vision, Target Optical, and Glasses.com. It also owns EyeMed, one of the largest vision health insurance providers. In addition to licensing prescription and non-prescription sunglasses frames for many luxury and designer brands including Chanel, Prada, Giorgio Armani, Burberry, Versace, Dolce and Gabbana, Michael Kors, Coach, Miu Miu and Tory Burch, the Italian corporation further outright owns and manufactures Ray-Ban, Persol, Oliver Peoples, and Oakley. Luxottica's market power has allowed it to charge price markups of up to 1000%.

In January 2017, Luxottica announced its merger with Essilor, in which Essilor would buy Luxottica while Del Vecchio would become executive chairman of the combined company, as well as co-lead the company with then-Essilor CEO Hubert Sagnières. The combined entity would command more than one quarter of global value sales of eyewear. In March 2018, the European Commission unconditionally approved the merger of Essilor and Luxottica. On 1 October 2018, the new holding company EssilorLuxottica was born, resulting in combined market capitalization of approximately $70 billion.

== History ==
=== Founding of Luxottica ===
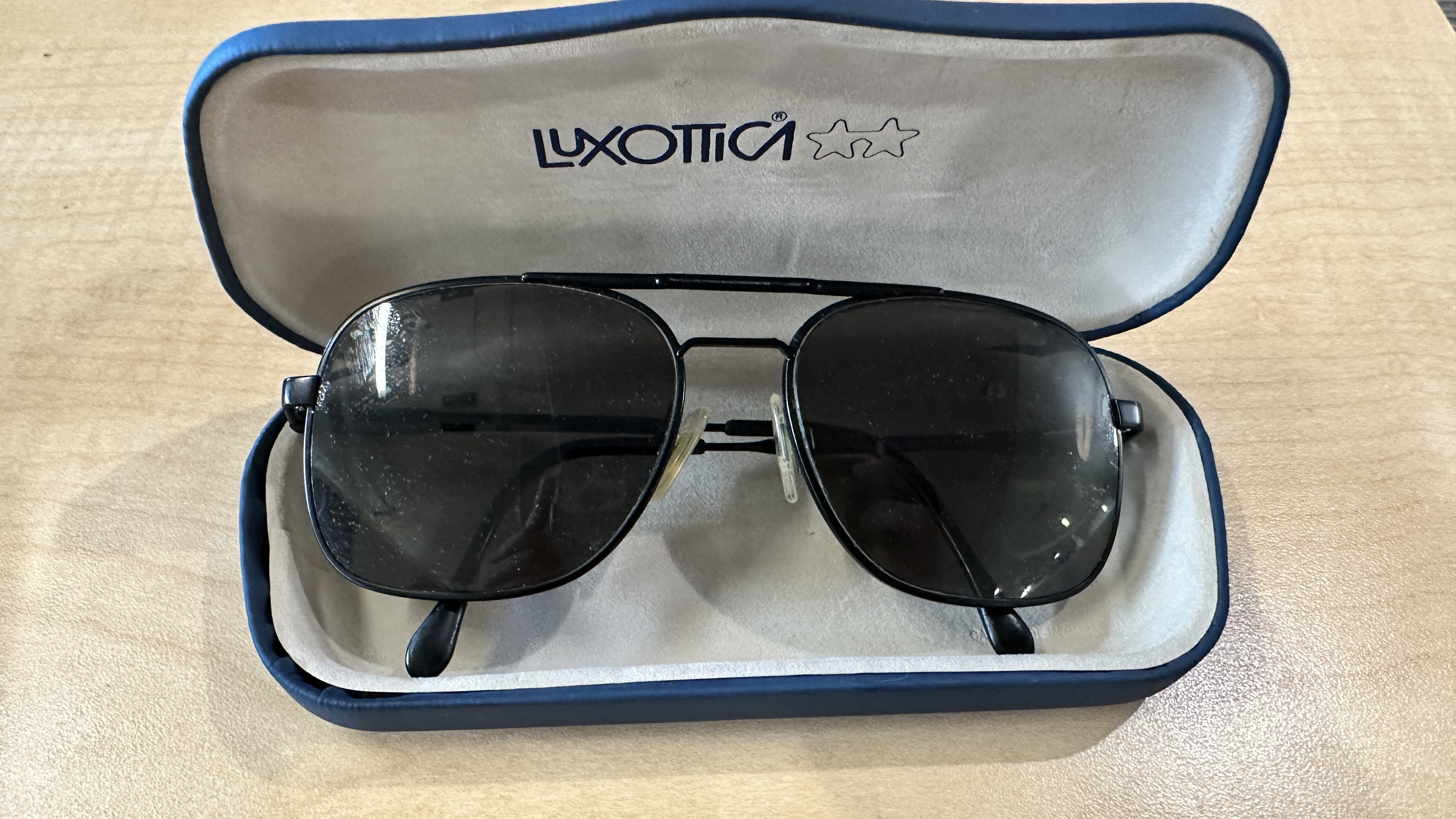
Luxottica Carlos sunglasses, produced by Luxottica prior to its licensing deals with fashion houses

Leonardo Del Vecchio started the company in 1961, in Agordo north of Belluno, Veneto; today the company is headquartered in Milan, Italy.

Del Vecchio began his career as the apprentice to a tool and diemaker in Milan, but he decided to turn his metalworking skills to making spectacle parts. In 1961, he moved to Agordo in the province of Belluno, home to most of the Italian eyewear industry. The new company was Luxottica s.a.s., a limited partnership with Del Vecchio as one of the founding partners. In 1967, he started selling complete eyeglass frames under the Luxottica brand, which proved successful enough that by 1971 he ended the contract manufacturing business.

=== Vertical integration and acquisitions ===
Convinced of the need for vertical integration, he acquired Scarrone in 1974, a distribution company. In 1981, the company set up its first international subsidiary, in Germany, the first in a rapid period of international expansion. The first of many licensing deals with a designer was struck with Giorgio Armani in 1988.

The company listed in New York in 1990, and in Milan in December 2000, joining the MIB-30 (now FTSE MIB) index in September 2003. The listing raised money for the company and allowed it to use its shares to acquire other brands, starting with Italian brand Vogue Eyewear in 1990, Persol and LensCrafters in 1995, Ray-Ban from Bausch & Lomb in 1999 and Sunglass Hut in 2001. Luxottica later increased its presence in the retail sector by acquiring Sydney-based OPSM in 2003, Pearle Vision and Cole National in 2004.

Luxottica acquired Oakley in November 2007 for US$2.1 billion. Oakley had tried to dispute their prices because of Luxottica's large marketshare, and Luxottica responded by dropping Oakley from their stores, causing their stock price to drop, followed by Luxottica's hostile take over of the company.

In August 2011, Luxottica acquired Erroca for €20 million. In March 2014, it was announced that Luxottica would partner with Google on the development of Google Glass and its integration into Luxottica's eyewear.

=== Reorganization and merger with Essilor ===
On 1 September 2014, a new organizational structure was announced, composed of two co-CEOs, one focusing on market development and the other overseeing corporate functions. After the exit of former CEO Andrea Guerra, Enrico Cavatorta was appointed CEO of Corporate Function and Interim CEO of Market (until new and permanent appointment to this role). Cavatorta left the company 40 days after being appointed CEO. In 2016, it was reported that Luxottica had lost its third chief executive in a year and a half, as Cavatora's replacement, Adil Mehboob-Khan stepped down one year after he gained the position. Upon the departure of Mehboob-Khan, Del Vecchio reclaimed executive powers and became much more active in the company.

In January 2017, the company agreed to a merger with Essilor. The deal also offered a succession plan for Leonardo Del Vecchio, the company's founder. Shortly before the merger completed, reporter Sam Knight wrote in The Guardian, "in seven centuries of spectacles, there has never been anything like it. The new entity will be worth around $50bn (£37bn), sell close to a billion pairs of lenses and frames every year, and have a workforce of more than 140,000 people." On 1 October 2018 the new holding company EssilorLuxottica was founded, resulting in combined market capitalization of approximately €46.3 billion as of the date of the merger announcement.

== Eyewear brands ==
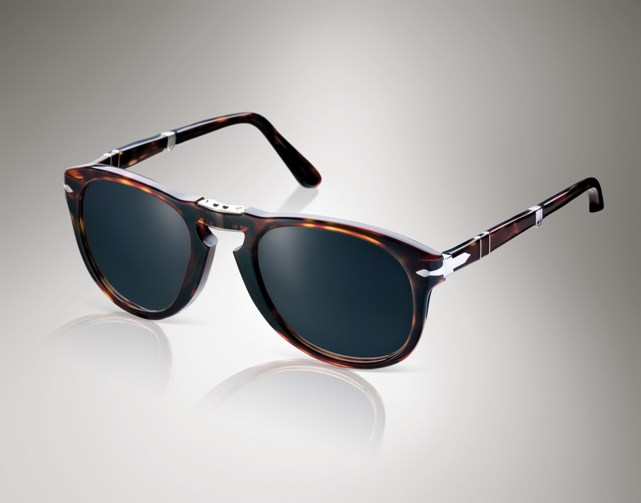
Persol sunglasses

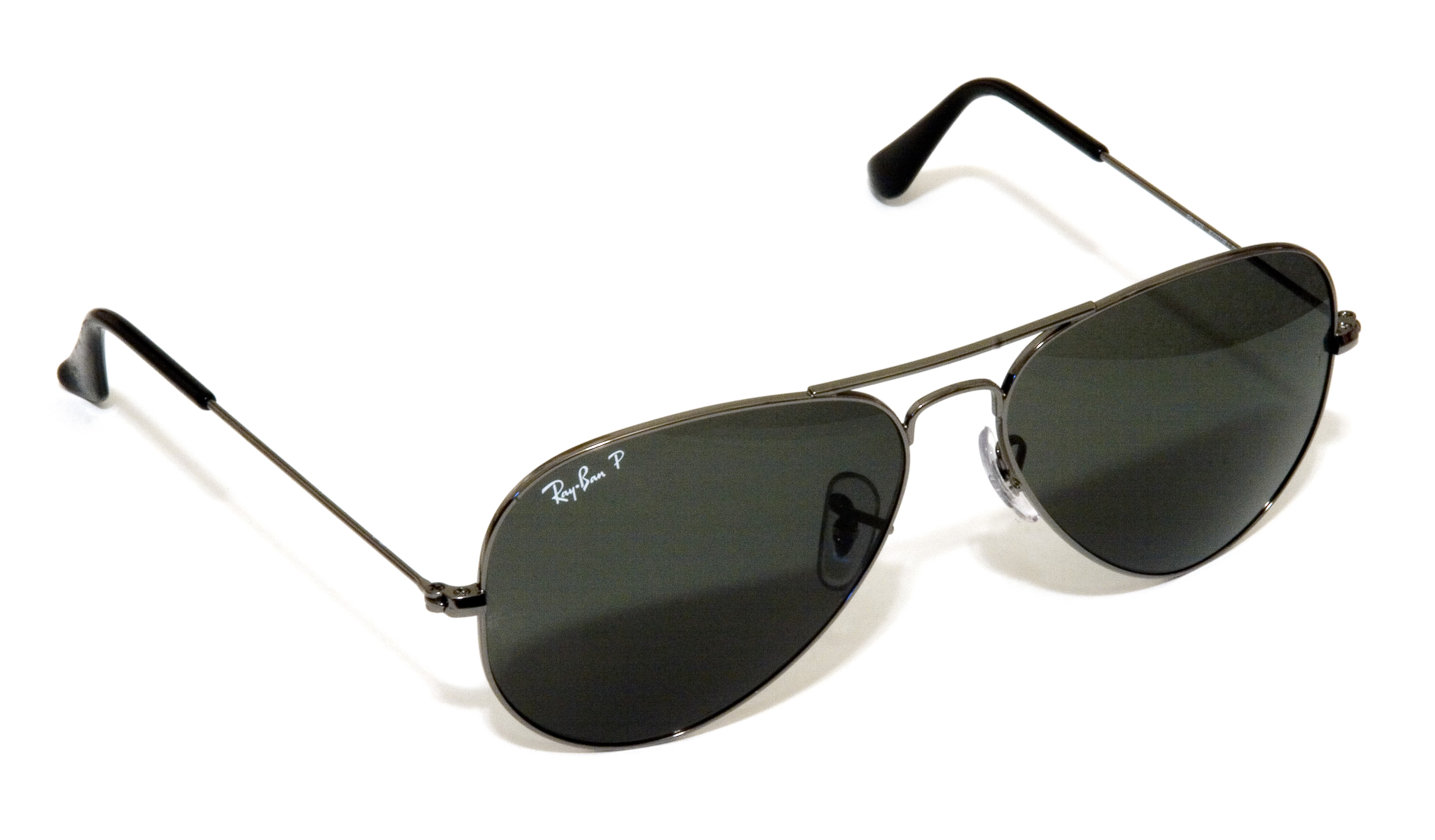
Ray-Ban's Aviators

Luxottica's two main product offerings are sunglasses and prescription frames. The company operates in two sectors: manufacturing & wholesale distribution, and retail distribution.

The house brands include the following:

- Alain Mikli
- Arnette eyewear
- Costa Del Mar
- Eye Safety Systems (ESS)
- Luxottica
- Native Eyewear
- Oakley
- Oliver Peoples
- Persol
- Ray-Ban
- Sferoflex
- Vogue Eyewear

The company also makes eyewear under license for the following designer labels:

- Giorgio Armani
- Armani Exchange
- Brooks Brothers
- Bulgari
- Burberry
- Chanel
- Coach
- Dolce & Gabbana
- Emporio Armani
- Michael Kors
- Miu Miu
- Polo Ralph Lauren
- Prada
- Ralph Eyewear
- Ralph Lauren
- Scuderia Ferrari
- Starck Biotech Paris
- Swarovski
- Tiffany & Co.
- Tory Burch
- Valentino
- Versace

These brands are sold in the company's own shops, as well as to independent distributors such as department stores, duty-free shops, and opticians.

== Retail ==
Luxottica Retail has about 9,100 retail locations in the United States, Latin America, Canada, India, China, Australia, New Zealand, South Africa, the United Kingdom, and United Arab Emirates. The headquarters of the retail division is in Mason, Ohio, United States (North America). Their retail banners include the following:

- Sunglass Hut
- Apex by Sunglass Hut
- Sunglass Outfitters by Sunglass Hut (locations within Bass Pro Shops and Cabela's stores)
- Spectacle Hut
- LensCrafters
- Clearly.ca
- Pearle Vision
- Target Optical
- OPSM
- Vision Express
- ILORI
- EyeMed Vision Care
- Optical Shop of Aspen
- Laubman & Pank
- GMO
- Oliver Peoples
- Alain Mikli
- Oakley
- David Clulow
- Glasses.com
- Econópticas
- Paris De Gaulle
- John Lewis Opticians (in Partnership with John Lewis and Partners department stores)
- Salmoiraghi e Viganò
- Óticas Carol
- VistaSì
- Ray-Ban

Luxottica is the largest optical retailer in the United States, with 7.3% of US retail sales in 2015. With its merger with Essilor in 2018 the company owns Coastal/Clearly, an online contacts and glasses retail giant bought in 2014 that ships to over 200 countries beside its original North American market.

== Medical managed care ==
Luxottica also owns EyeMed Vision Care, a managed vision care organization in the United States. As of 2014, it is the second-largest vision benefits company in the United States.

== Philanthropy ==
Luxottica is affiliated with the charitable organization OneSight, formed in 1988. In August 2018, Luxottica restored Accademia Bridge in Venice. In March 2022, EssilorLuxottica announced the launch of the OneSight EssilorLuxottica Foundation to unify the group's philanthropic efforts, primarily providing vision services to underserved communities.

== Criticism ==
=== Monopolistic pricing practices ===
The company has been criticized for the high price of its brand-name glasses, such as Ray-Ban, Oakley, and several others. A 2012 60 Minutes segment focused on whether the company's extensive holdings in the industry were used to keep prices high. Luxottica owns not only a large portfolio of brands (over a dozen) such as Ray-Ban and Oakley but also retailers such as Sunglass Hut, Lenscrafters and Oliver Peoples, the optical departments at Target, and (formerly) Sears, as well as key eye insurance groups including the second largest glasses insurance firm in the US, EyeMed. It has been accused of operating a complete monopoly on the optical industry and overcharging for its products; for example, temporarily dropping then-competitor Oakley from its frame design list, then, when the company stock crashed, purchasing the company, then increasing the prices of its Ray-Ban sunglasses. In addition, it has been argued that, by owning the vision insurance company EyeMed, it also controls part of the buyers' market as well.

The company has said that the market is highly competitive, and that their frames account for ≈10% of sales worldwide and ≈20% in the United States. In 2017, their share of the prescription lens market was 41%. Euromonitor International estimated that Luxottica's market share was 14% worldwide, with the second-largest company in the industry, Essilor, holding a 13% market share. The third-largest player was Johnson & Johnson, with a 3.9% market share. In October 2018, Luxottica and Essilor merged into a single company, EssilorLuxottica, which now occupies nearly 30% of the global market share and represents almost a billion pairs of lenses and frames sold annually.

Despite not owning most of the market, the company has considerable price-setting power. It uses "spiff money", financial incentives to reward other industry players who co-operate with it, and has repeatedly driven companies that competed with it on price out of business, crashing their market share and stock price, then buying them out. It has used a variety of techniques, including compelling retailers to drop suppliers and making imitations of competitor's products. It also funds university chairs of ophthalmology and is influential in professional associations.

The HBO series Last Week Tonight with John Oliver has criticized the company as a prominent instance of corporate consolidation, as has the TruTV series Adam Ruins Everything.

In 2019, LensCrafters founder E. Dean Butler spoke to the Los Angeles Times, admitting that Luxottica's dominance of the eyewear industry had resulted in price markups of nearly 1,000%. In the interview, Butler noted "You can get amazingly good frames, with a Warby Parker level of quality, for $4 to $8. For $15, you can get designer-quality frames, like what you'd get from Prada." When told that some eyeglasses cost as much as $800 in the United States, Butler remarked, "I know. It's ridiculous. It's a complete rip-off."

== Major shareholders ==
The list of Luxottica shareholders with more than 2% of holdings, December 2014.

- Delfin S.à r.l. a company controlled by Leonardo Del Vecchio's descendants 66.485%
- Deutsche Bank Trust Company Americas (as ADR depository) 7.466%
- Giorgio Armani 4.955%

== See also ==
- Essilor
- Safilo
