= Harald Belker =

German automotive/product designer

Harald Georg Belker (born May 27, 1961, Krefeld) is a German entertainment/automotive/product designer best known for his vehicle designs in films such as Batman & Robin and Minority Report. His designs range from fantastic entertainment designs to ergonomic user-friendly product design.

He was educated at the Art Center College of Design in Automotive Design after graduating from Georgia Southern University in Industrial Technology. He received an honorary doctor's degree from Art Center.

== Career ==
Belker's career started in 1991 at Mercedes Benz Advanced Design in Irvine, California. As part of the team responsible for the Smart Car design, he went on to work independently, eventually ending up in entertainment design. Here he had his most significant success. He also explored furniture design, his Maxelle chair winning the excellent award, and he is responsible for the design of the line of sunglasses for Kaenon Polarized, a Newport Beach, California–based company, that focuses on fashionable but active lifestyle. He has published a couple of design books, Pulse, explaining his future vision for high-speed vehicle racing, and Ride, which showcases the design of a futuristic electric motorcycle. From 2012 to 2019 he was working for Anki as head of design, a robotics and artificial intelligence startup company whose headquarters is in San Francisco. He currently switches between Entertainment and Product design to keep him engaged and busy.

== Filmography ==
- Moonfall (2022) – Rover vehicle design, Shuttle design
- Edge of Tomorrow (2014) – flying vehicle designs, exoskeleton suit
- Star Trek Into Darkness (2013) – vehicle designs
- Oblivion (2013) – Motorcycle designs
- Total Recall (2012) – vehicle designs
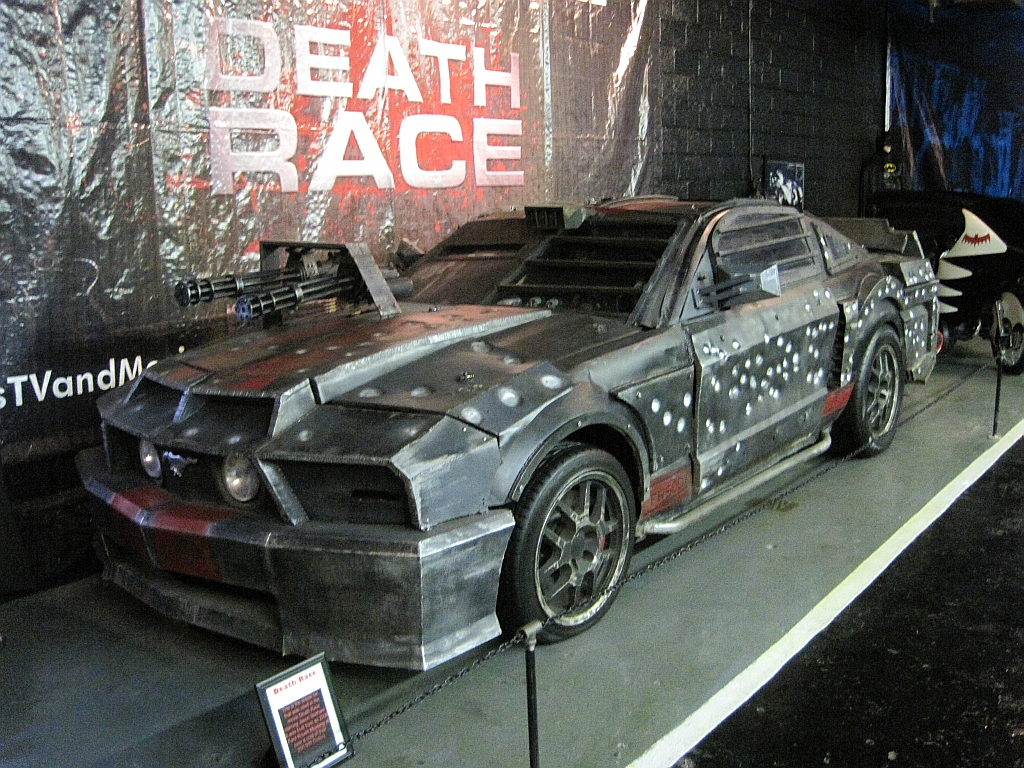
  Modified Mustang from Death Race
- In Time (2011) – vehicle designs
- Battleship (2012) – design of ships and weapons
- Iron Man 2 (2010) – design and graphics for the race cars
- Tron: Legacy (2010) – early concepts on the Light Bike and design of the Guard Bikes
- Dragonball Evolution (2009) – design of weapons and vehicles
- Death Race (2008) – design of all the vehicle armor
- Iron Man (2008) – design of a car that was later scratched, alternative weapons for the suit
- Transformers (2007) – design of several background vehicles
- Spider-Man 3 (2006) – design of the Sky–Stick
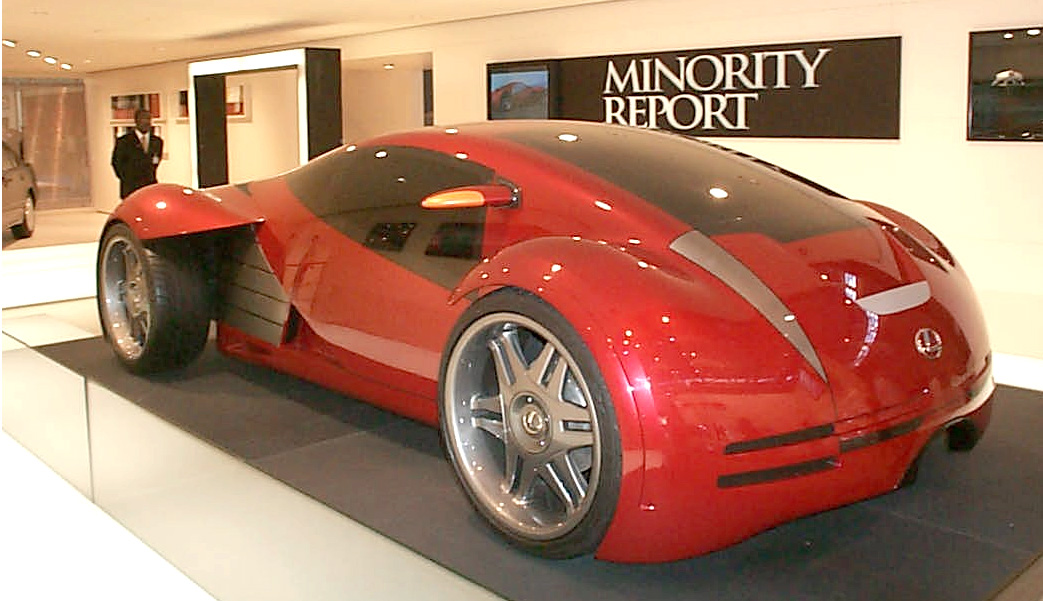
- Lexus 2054 Concept from Minority Report
  XXX: State of the Union (2004) – re-design of the GTO and Mustang
- Zathura (2004) – Robot design and studio sketches for the At–Home, car designer
- Serenity (2004) – design of the Thug Attack Sled
- Constantine (2004) – Prop design
- Stealth (2003) – design of EDI and plane interior
- The Cat in the Hat (2002) – design of the S.L.O.W. Car
- XXX (2001) – design of the GTO
- Minority Report (2001) – design of the Maglev vehicles, futuristic transportation system and red Lexus sports car
- Superman (2001) – design of the alien space fleet
- Spider-Man (2000) – design of the Pumpkin Bomb and several other gadgets
- Battlefield Earth (2000) – design of the alien attack craft
- Fahrenheit 451 (1999) – design of the fire truck
- Inspector Gadget (1998) – design of the Gadgetmobile
- Deep Blue Sea (1998) – concept art
- Supernova (1997) – concept art
- Armageddon (1997) – design of the X–71 Space Shuttle
- Batman & Robin (1996) – design of the Batmobile, Redbird motorcycle and all other vehicles

== Other works ==
- Apple – Consumer Product Development.
- Samsung – Consumer Product Development.
- ANKI - Head Consumer Product Designer.
- Oblong – design for a gloveless hand devise for the g-speak interface.
- Shell – Hydrofuel station design proposal.
- Kaenon Polarized – design for the complete line of sunglasses.
- Solar Monkey, electric car design.
- Lee Iacocca – e-bike, first full electric bicycle.
- Studio Roundhouse – Hydrapak, hydration backpack line.
- Mattel Toys – Hot Wheels
- Gnomon workshop – five design tutorials, from concept to finished art work for automotive design.
- Digital Anvil – designs for all the ships of the Freelancer computer game.
- Nissan Design International - design consultant for Quest show car.
- Mercedes Benz Advanced Design – worked on designs for the Smart car, M-class and S-class.
- Porsche Design Germany – design entry for the model 996.

== Personal life ==
He resides in the coastal community of Mar Vista, outside Los Angeles with his wife Thanda Belker and their daughter Skye. In his free time he enjoys kitesurfing and snowboarding as well as spending time with his family.
