= Meta smart glasses =

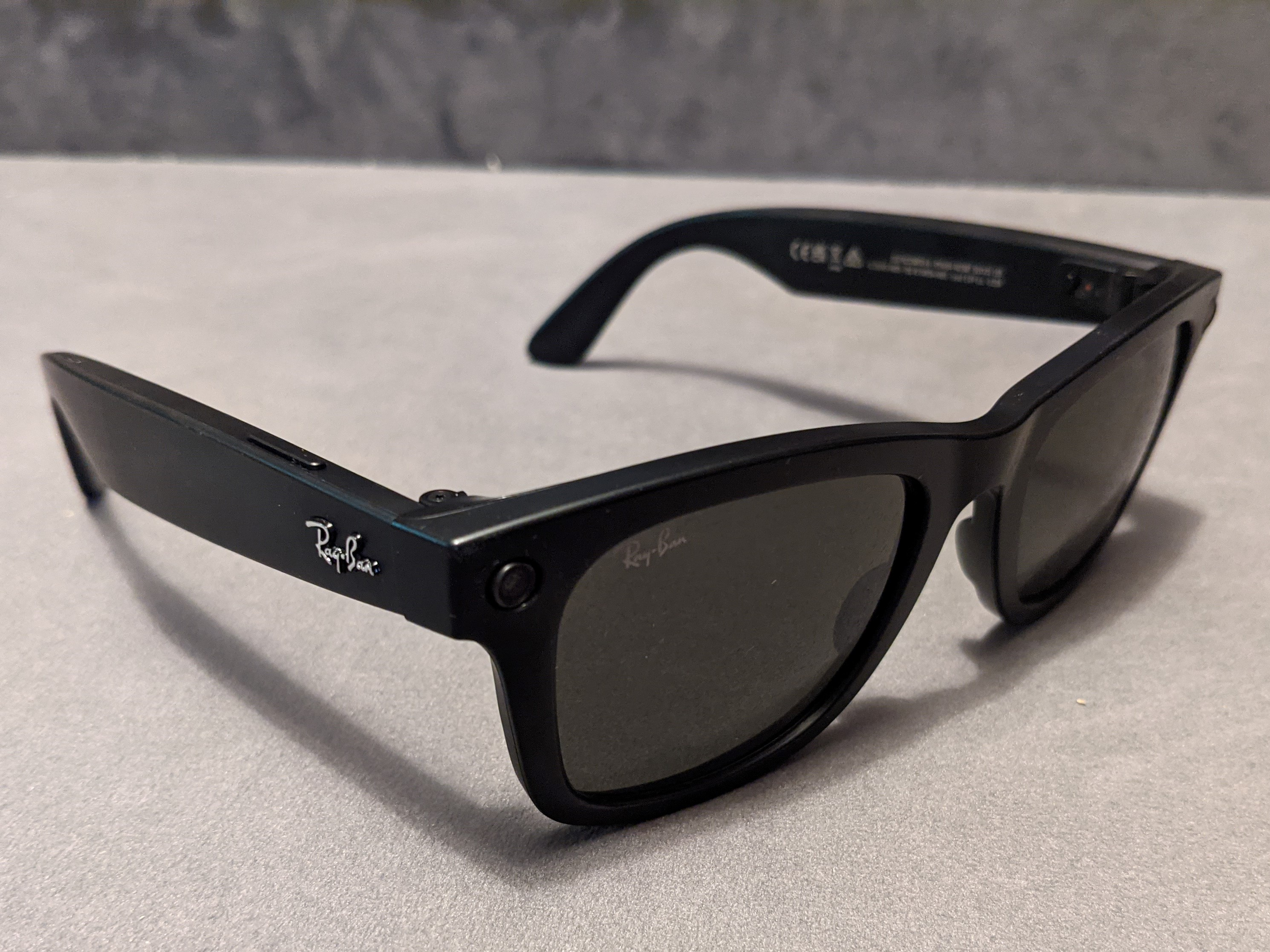
The Wayfarer model of Ray-Ban Stories glasses, launched in 2021

In September 2021, Meta launched Ray-Ban Stories, its first generation of smart glasses. In 2023, Meta and Ray-Ban released Ray-Ban Meta, the second generation of the companies' smart glasses line, with Meta AI integration. In June 2026, Meta released additional smart glasses called Meta Glasses. Meta's smart glasses have received criticism stemming from mistrust over Facebook's privacy controls, the small size and ease of removal of the recording indicator light, and privacy and ethical concerns, with people labeling them pervert glasses.

== Partnership and release ==
=== Ray-Ban Stories ===
The partnership between EssilorLuxottica, Ray-Ban's parent company, and Facebook to create the first generation of Ray-Ban Stories was publicly announced on September 20, 2020, by CEO Mark Zuckerberg during the seventh annual Facebook Connect conference. During the keynote video, Zuckerberg described several new Facebook innovations, such as the Oculus Quest 2, a new augmented reality division called Project Aria, and the Ray-Ban Stories themselves.

In the following year after its initial announcement, Zuckerberg and Facebook Chief Technology Officer Andrew Bosworth would hint at a 2021 release date through FPV (first person view) video clips appearing to be taken using a Ray-Ban Stories prototype.

On September 9, 2021, Facebook launched Ray-Ban Stories, which were touted as the company's first product related to its plans for a metaverse. It came in two models: Skyler and Wayfarer.

==== Hardware and compatibility ====
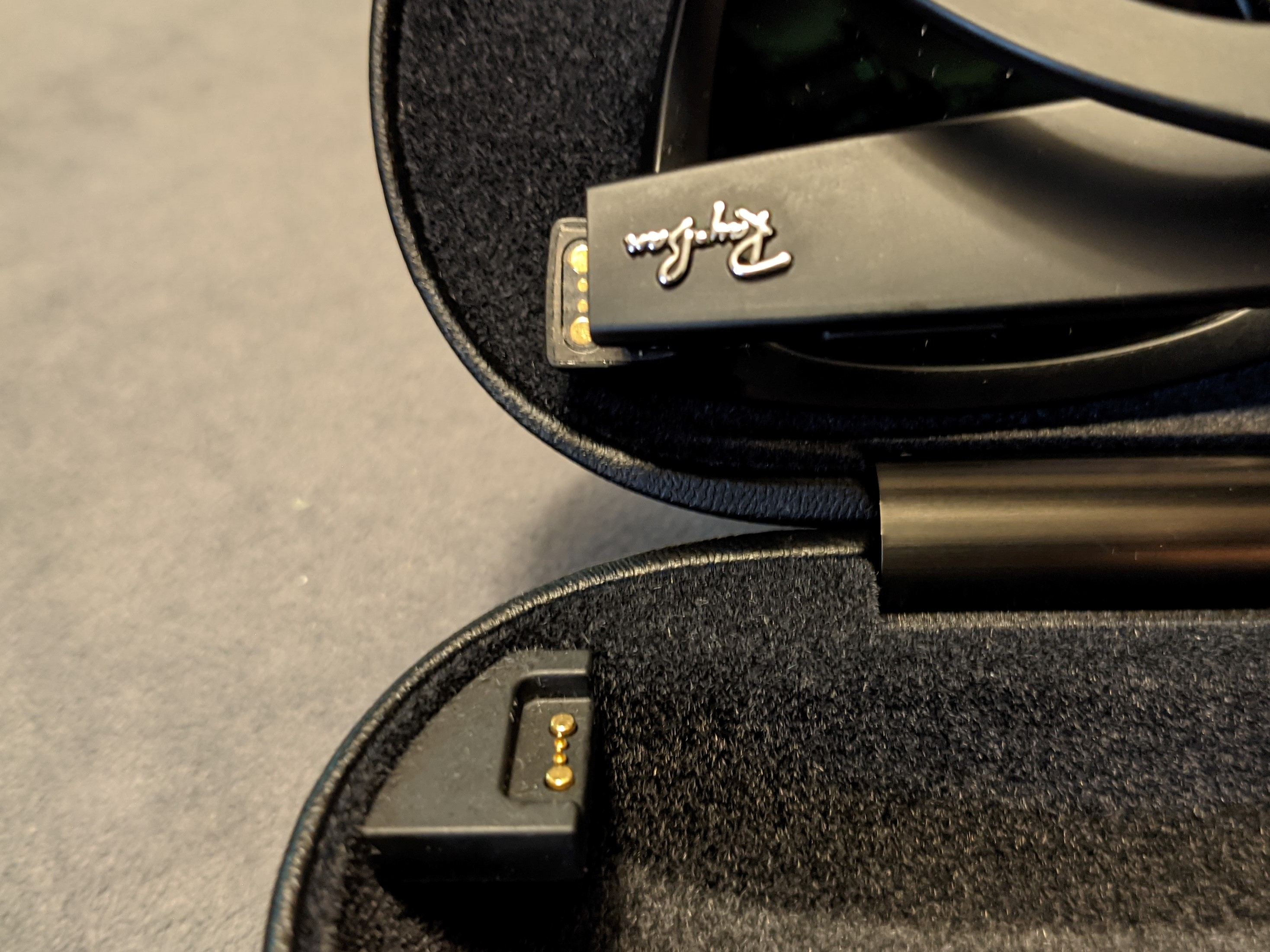
Ray-Ban Stories charging mechanism

Ray-Ban Stories glasses come in three designs: Round, Wayfarer, and Meteor. Each of these designs come in up to six colors with polarized, transitioning, blue-light filtering, and single or progressive prescription lenses. The glasses also come with a camera for pictures and another for video, and connect to the phone with Bluetooth. A Facebook account is required to store photos and videos. The temples of the frames contain speakers and microphones, used for Facebook Assistant voice control. On the top of the right temple there is a touchpad to take a 30-second video by tapping once or take a photo by holding down on the touchpad. The included USB-C charging case and cable charges the glasses in just over an hour with three hours of battery life. A Qualcomm Snapdragon processor integrates the cameras, microphones, speakers, and touchpad.

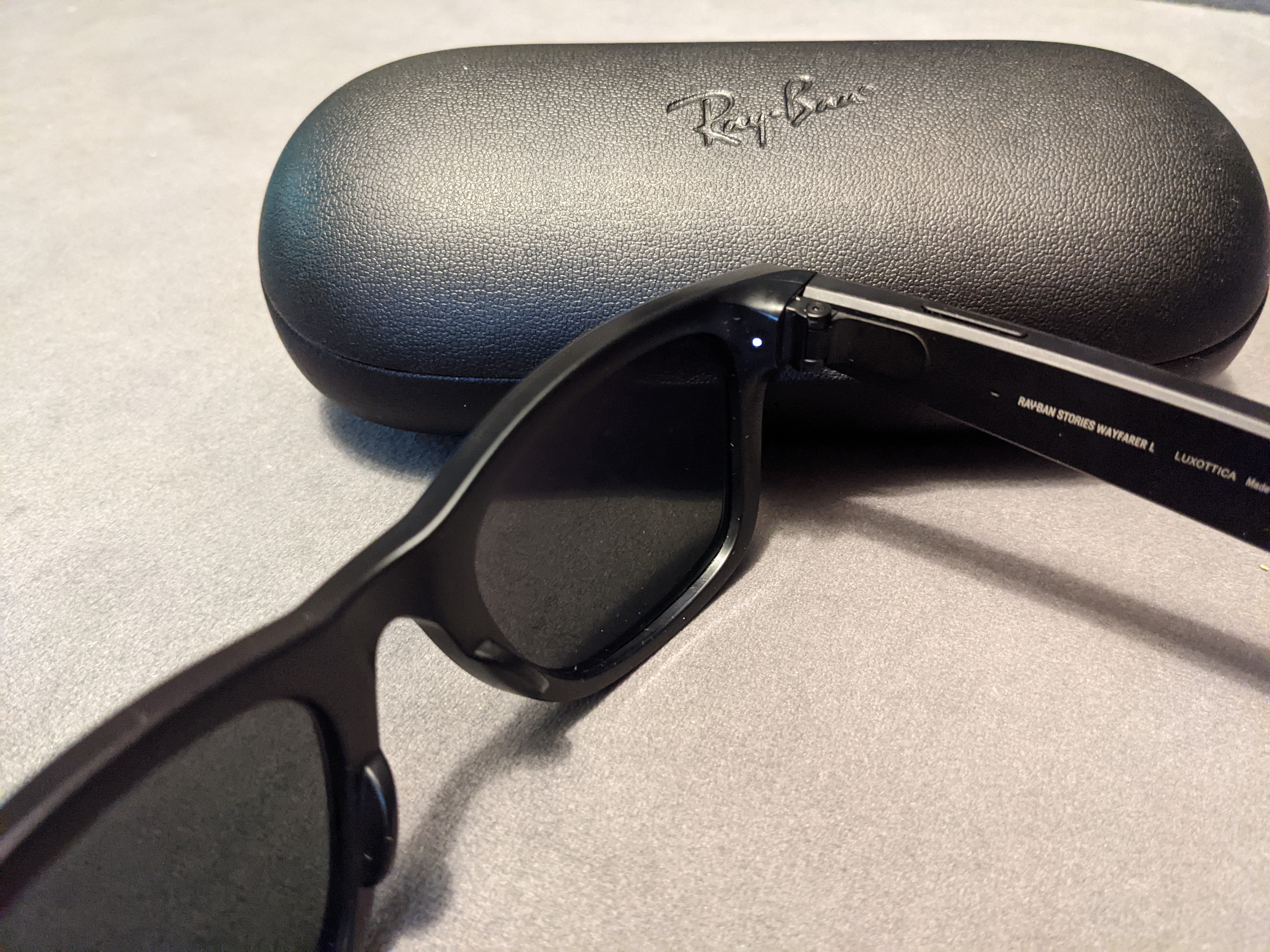
Ray-Ban Stories, Feedback LED, and Case

Stories are compatible with iOS and Android. They currently work with Marvs that made the iOS 13 and Android 8.1 and later, and do not have backward compatibility. They support Bluetooth 5.0. The Ray-Ban Stories connect to Wi-Fi 802.11ac.

=== Ray-Ban Meta ===
Unlike other smart glasses, the Ray-Ban Meta glasses do not include any heads-up display (HUD) or augmented reality (AR) head-mounted display. Meta announced them on September 27, 2023. They use a Qualcomm Snapdragon AR1 Gen1 processor, upgrade of the cameras to 12 MP, improved audio, livestreaming to Facebook and Instagram, and Meta AI.

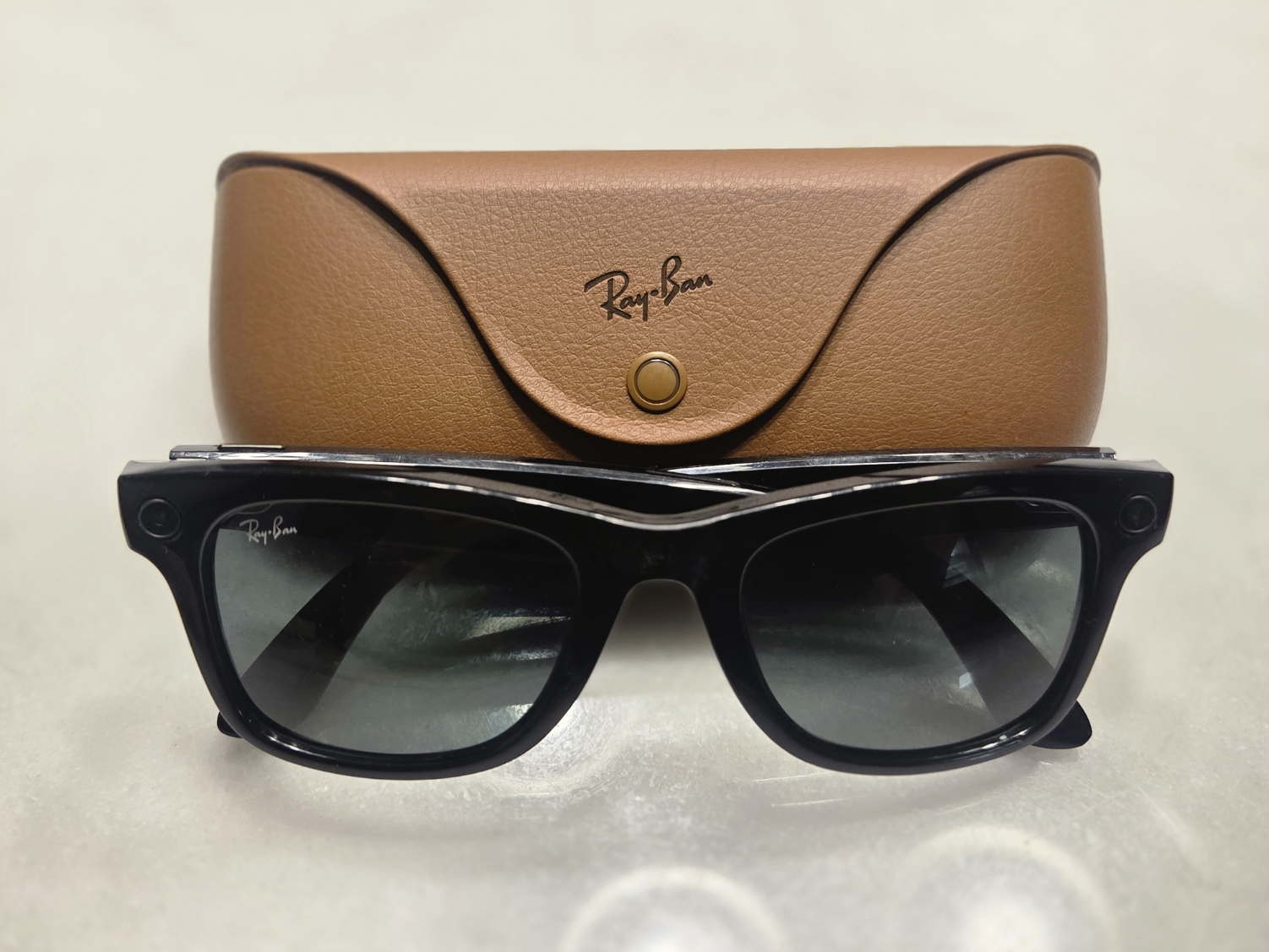
A pair of shiny black Ray-Ban Meta smart glasses positioned in front of their brown leather charging case.

On October 17, 2023, Meta and Ray-ban released Meta Smart Glasses with upgraded features: improved camera and microphone, water resistance, longer recording times, and a voice interface with Meta AI.

On April 23, 2024, Meta announced an update to Meta AI on the smart glasses to enable multimodal input via computer vision.

=== Ray-Ban Meta (Gen 2) / Oakley Meta ===
On June 20, 2025, Meta announced the release of a second generation of glasses in partnership with Oakley, Inc. (a EssilorLuxottica subsidiary), the "Oakley Meta" glasses, with a focus on sports and performance lifestyles. The first Oakley Meta glasses were the HSTN (released on August 26, 2025), followed by Vanguard (announced September 18, 2025).

=== Ray-Ban Meta (Gen 3) ===
In October 2026, Meta announced the release of a third generation of glasses in partnership with Ray-Ban.

=== Meta Ray-Ban Display ===
At Meta Connect 2025, the company announced the Meta Ray-Ban Display, the company's first AI glasses with an integrated display and neural wristband.

Prior to their reveal of the Meta Ray-Ban Display, at Connect 2024, Meta presented Orion, its first pair of augmented reality glasses. Though Orion was originally intended to be sold to consumers, the manufacturing process turned out to be too complex and expensive. Instead, the company pivoted to producing a small number of the glasses to be used internally as a developer kit as they continue to explore ways to bring it to consumers. Meta's Orion prototype represents their vision for what true 6DOF AR glasses could look like and should not be confused with the Meta Ray-Ban Display glasses.

=== Meta Glasses ===
On June 23, 2026, Meta introduced new pairs of smartglasses called "Meta Glasses", in partnership with EssilorLuxottica.

=== Meta VR Glasses ===
In spring 2027, there will be a new $1,299 VR Glasses that is 100 grams.

== Development ==
According to Facebook, the Luxottica team re-engineered the components of the glasses to fit technology such as: a set of micro-speakers, a three-microphone audio array, an optimized Snapdragon processor, a capacitive touchpad, and a battery. As the glasses are very small, their size caused the engineers to miniaturize each component.

Facebook also states that their engineers used a bass-reflex system in developing the microphones to improve audio quality. For the camera system, an extensive image processing pipeline was utilized to produce high quality video.

To find a viable charging solution, Facebook said they explored multiple solutions and created 20 engineering validation tests to ensure the charging worked.

To address privacy concerns of users and those around them, engineers said they created a hardware power switch and a hardwired LED light to indicate when the camera is recording.

=== Meta view app ===
Meta released the Facebook View mobile app (later on changed named to Meta View) on August 23, 2021, in both the Apple App Store and Google Play Store. When using the app, users are prompted to log in with their Facebook account before pairing their Ray-Ban Stories to get access to sharing and management features. Current features on the app include importing, editing, and formatting photos and videos shot on Ray-Ban Stories for sharing on Meta-affiliated products such as Instagram, Messenger, WhatsApp, and other social media sites. The app also shows the Stories' battery percentage.

=== Assistive technology benefits ===
The AI can describe surroundings; read text aloud using optical character recognition (OCR) and speech synthesis; and provide turn-by-turn directions. This technology could improve quality of life and independence for visually impaired users.

== Privacy and ethical concerns ==
Ray-Ban Meta smart glasses have been released amid much debate about privacy and ethics. The glasses are designed to look like conventional Ray-Ban sunglasses, so critics fear users could record or photograph those around them without their consent, raising fears about surveillance in public and private spaces. The glasses have a small white LED light that activates to show that they are recording, but whether this notification is visible or effective, especially in low-light situations, has come under scrutiny. 404 Media released an investigation into a cheap modification kit that can disable the recording light, further raising privacy and ethical concerns. In January 2026, BBC News reported on a number of such cases where pickup artists use Ray-Ban Meta glasses to film themselves talking to women without their knowledge, obtain personal information such as their phone number or place of employment, and then upload those videos to platforms such as TikTok without redacting their private information, resulting in harassment and stalking of the victims from social media users. As a consequence, the glasses have been dubbed "pervert glasses" on social media.

A significant concern surrounding the device's listening capabilities is the risk of eavesdropping. As the glasses have multiple microphones for capturing audio, there are fears that they could inadvertently or intentionally record conversations without the awareness of those nearby. This could lead to privacy violations, particularly in private settings or sensitive environments. While Meta asserts that the glasses activate only upon hearing the "Hey, Facebook" wake phrase, skeptics remain wary of potential unauthorized data collection. The Facebook View app's privacy policy states that users' voice commands may be sent to Meta's servers unless explicitly opted out, a detail that has fueled broader concerns about transparency and data control.

Another contentious issue is data storage and access. The recording capabilities of the glasses, particularly when coupled with Meta's AI technology, raise questions about how data is stored, who has access to it, and how it is protected from misuse or breaches. Concerns about how long data is retained and whether it could be used for commercial or surveillance purposes are prominent.

There are ethical reviews and academic studies that criticize and highlight possible misuse of the features. One impactful 2024 study showed that hacked Ray-Ban Meta glasses could engage in real-time recognition, raising anxiety about mass surveillance and profiling. Given such risks, the Irish Data Protection Commission (DPC) has asked for tougher action to ensure the glasses comply with Europe's General Data Protection Regulation (GDPR) rules.

In January 2026, Futurism reported on a man who lost his job and became estranged from his family after being deluded by heavy use of the glasses, which gave him a messiah complex and convinced him that aliens were visiting imminently.

Despite these concerns, advocates of the glasses highlight potential benefits, such as it offering assistance for visually impaired people, and hands-free communication. Critics, however, believe that these advancements must be accompanied by robust privacy protections and ethical usage guidelines. Meta's official recommendations, which include things like letting people maintain personal boundaries and switching off the device in sensitive environments, are designed to encourage responsible use but may not do much to relieve deeper systemic issues related to surveillance.

Harvard University students used PimEyes on the glasses to see information (including names, phone numbers and home address) in real time from just a face captured by the glasses. A Meta spokesperson said, "Pimeyes ... could be used with ANY camera ... this isn't something that only is possible because of Meta Ray-Bans" but 404 Media noted that the students "choose to use Meta's Ray Bans: because in passing, they look just like any other pair of glasses".

In February 2026, The New York Times reported that Facebook planned to add face recognition to the glasses. In June 2026, Wired reported that the company "had begun shipping face-recognition code".

In July 2026, Meta began rolling out an update that disables the glasses' camera when tampering with or damage to the recording-indicator LED is detected. Earlier versions displayed a warning when the light was covered, although modifications had been developed to bypass that measure.

During the 2026 Delhi Jantar Mantar protests, visuals from protest site showed some Delhi police personnel wearing Meta smart glasses alongside other surveillance equipment.

=== European Union regulatory framework and GDPR compliance ===
Privacy concerns surrounding the Ray-Ban Meta glasses are particularly pronounced in the European Union (EU), where stricter data protection and AI regulations have influenced feature availability and prompted ongoing scrutiny.

The discreet design enables covert image, video, and audio capture, processing personal data of both users and bystanders (including potentially identifiable biometric information such as faces or voices). Under the General Data Protection Regulation (GDPR), processing such data requires a lawful basis—such as explicit consent or legitimate interests—and transparency toward affected individuals. Meta has cited "legitimate interest" for certain activities, but critics argue this is insufficient for high-risk processing like incidental bystander recording or using European personal data to train Meta AI models without opt-in consent.

In May 2025, privacy advocacy group NOYB sent Meta a cease-and-desist letter alleging unlawful use of EU personal data for AI training, threatening potential collective redress actions under the EU Collective Redress Directive. Regulators in Ireland (via the Data Protection Commission) and Italy have questioned the glasses since 2021, particularly regarding the effectiveness of the recording LED as a notice mechanism for bystanders.

The EU Artificial Intelligence Act (effective 2024, with full obligations by 2026) may classify certain Meta AI features on the glasses as "high-risk" if they involve biometric processing (e.g., visual analysis or recognition capabilities), requiring fundamental rights impact assessments, transparency measures, and risk mitigation. Due to these rules, some advanced AI functionalities have faced delayed or restricted rollouts in the EU, with models in some cases not trained on local European user data, potentially reducing performance compared to other regions.

=== Ethical implications ===
Beyond legal compliance, ethicists and digital rights groups highlight broader societal risks: normalization of always-on wearable cameras could erode social trust, facilitate harassment, stalking, or doxxing (as demonstrated in real-world misuse cases), and create imbalances between wearers and non-wearers. While Meta provides usage guidelines promoting respect for privacy (e.g., avoiding sensitive environments), critics contend these are insufficient given the hardware's unobtrusive design and the potential for AI training on captured data without adequate safeguards.

=== Restrictions ===
In July 2026, New York announced a statewide ban on camera- and microphone-equipped smart glasses and other electronic eyewear in all facilities of the New York State Unified Court System, effective July 20. The policy applies to the state's 1,240 state, county, city, town and village courts, and requires people carrying such devices to surrender them to court officers before entering.

In August 2026, His Majesty's Courts and Tribunals Service announced that Meta glasses would be banned from courts in England and Wales under current rules.

== See also ==
- Google Glass – Optical head-mounted computer glasses
- Gentle Monster Intelligent Eyewear – Upcoming Android XR smart glasses collection
- Spectacles (product) – Smartglasses for recording Snapchat video
- EyeTap – Wearable computer worn in front of the eye
- Golden-i
- Microsoft HoloLens – Mixed reality smartglasses
- Looxcie – Video camera, webcam
- Oculus Rift – Virtual reality headsets by Oculus VR
- Pristine (company)
- SixthSense – Gesture-based wearable computer system
- Virtual retinal display – Display technology
- Vuzix – American multinational technology
- Criticism of Facebook
- Privacy concerns with Facebook
- Facebook–Cambridge Analytica data scandal – 2010s social media data misuse
- Metaverse – Collective 3D virtual shared space
