= Ray-Ban Wayfarer =

Line of sunglasses by Ray-Ban

Ray-Ban Wayfarer sunglasses and eyeglasses have been manufactured by Ray-Ban since 1952. Made popular in the 1950s and 1960s by music and film icons such as Buddy Holly, Roy Orbison and James Dean, Wayfarers almost became discontinued in the 1970s, before a major resurgence was created in the 1980s through massive product placements.

The Ray-Ban brand was sold to Italian Luxottica Group in 1999, who created a second revival in the mid 2000s.

== Design and early popularity ==
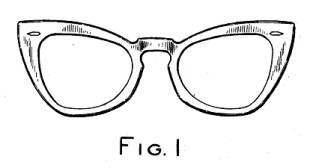
Figure 1, US design patent #169,995

Wayfarers were designed in 1952 by American optical designer Raymond Stegeman, who worked for Bausch & Lomb, Ray-Ban's parent company at that time. The design was inspired, "a mid-century classic to rival Eames chairs and Cadillac tail fins". According to design critic Stephen Bayley, the "distinctive trapezoidal frame spoke a non-verbal language that hinted at unstable dangerousness, but one nicely tempered by the sturdy arms which, according to the advertising, gave the frames a 'masculine look'." The sunglasses also featured a new plastic molding technology.

== 1970s and 1980s ==
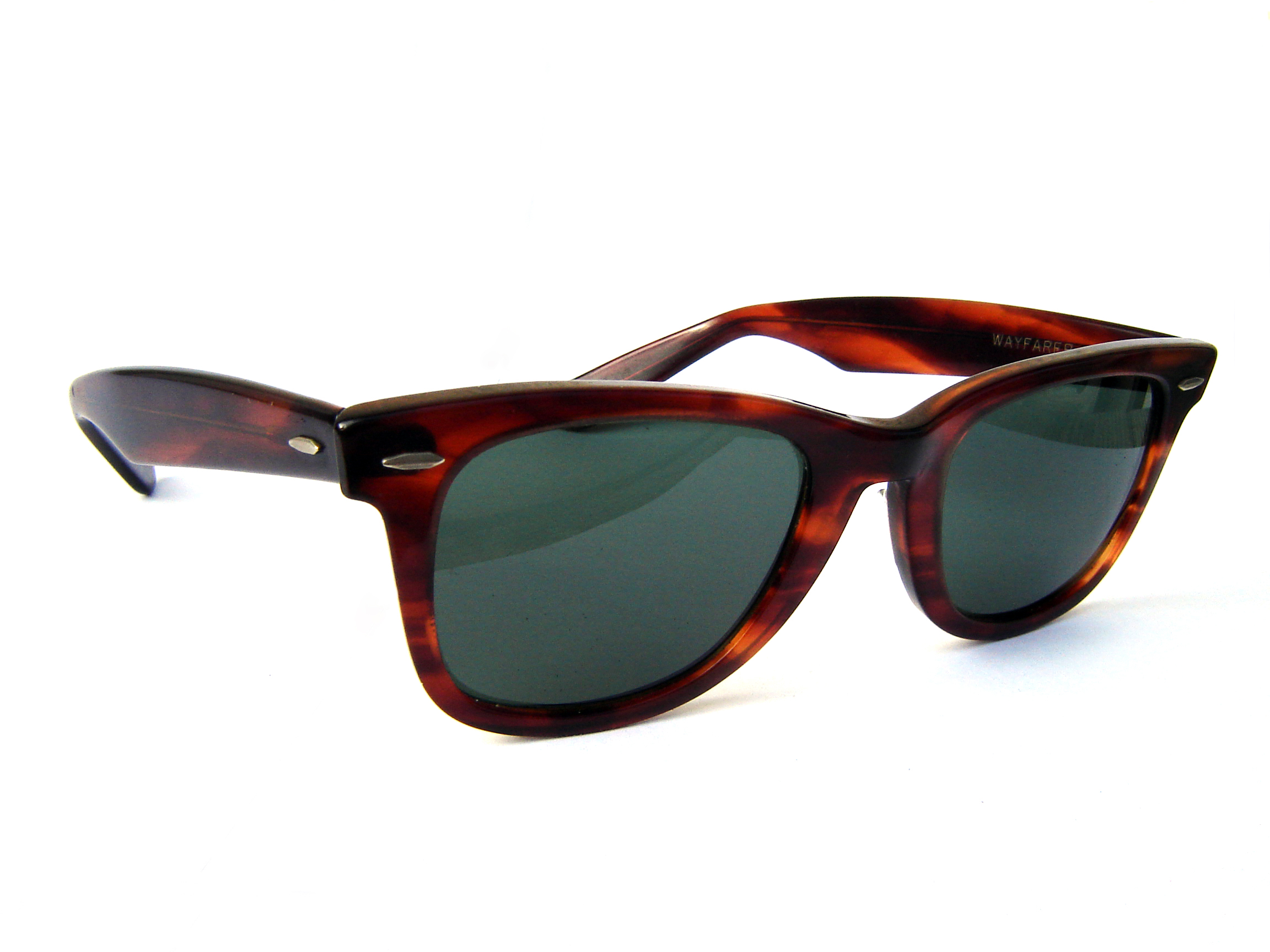
Classic 1980s Ray-Ban Wayfarer sunglasses (picture shows model B&L5022, another one named B&L5024 is also available, which is 2 mm wider at the nose bridge but identical otherwise)

After Wayfarers' heyday in the 1950s and 1960s, sales declined. Though Wayfarers' cultural popularity was aided in 1980 by the film The Blues Brothers, only 18,000 pairs were sold in 1981, and Wayfarers were on the verge of discontinuation. In 1982 Ray-Ban signed a $50,000-a-year deal with Unique Product Placement of Burbank, California, to place Ray-Bans in movies and television shows. Between 1982 and 1987, Ray-Ban sunglasses appeared in over 60 movies and television shows per year, continuing through 2007. Tom Cruise's wearing of Wayfarers in the 1983 movie Risky Business was one of the key placements, and that year 360,000 pairs were sold. Additional appearances in movies like The Breakfast Club, and series like Miami Vice and Moonlighting, led to sales of 1.5 million annually.

Wayfarers were also worn by various musicians, including Roy Orbison, Michael Jackson, George Michael, Rick Astley, Billy Joel, Johnny Marr, Blondie's Debbie Harry, Madonna, Depeche Mode, Elvis Costello, and members of U2 and Queen, as well as public figures such as Max Headroom, Jack Nicholson, and Anna Wintour.

The novels of Bret Easton Ellis often contain references to Wayfarers. Lyrics that mentioned the style of glasses included Don Henley's 1984 song "The Boys of Summer", which contained the lyric "You got that hair slicked back and those Wayfarers on, baby". Corey Hart's music video “Sunglasses at Night” shows the artists wearing Wayfarers in darkness. In response to these placements, Ray-Ban's Wayfarer expanded from two models in 1981 to about 40 models by 1989.

== 1990s ==
As the 1990s began, the frames again became unpopular. The 1950s revival that fueled the glasses' popularity in the 1980s lost momentum, and Wayfarers were outcompeted by wraparound frames. During the slump of the 1990s, Ray-Ban's parent company Bausch & Lomb was facing pressure from competitors like Oakley. In 1999, Bausch & Lomb sold Ray-Ban to Luxottica Group S.p.A. of Italy for $640 million. In 2001, the Wayfarer underwent a significant redesign (RB2132), with the frames made smaller and less angular, and changed from acetate to a lighter injected plastic. The changes were intended to update the frames' style during a period of unpopularity and to make them easier to wear (the frames' previous tilt made them impossible to perch on top of one's head, for instance).

== 2000s ==
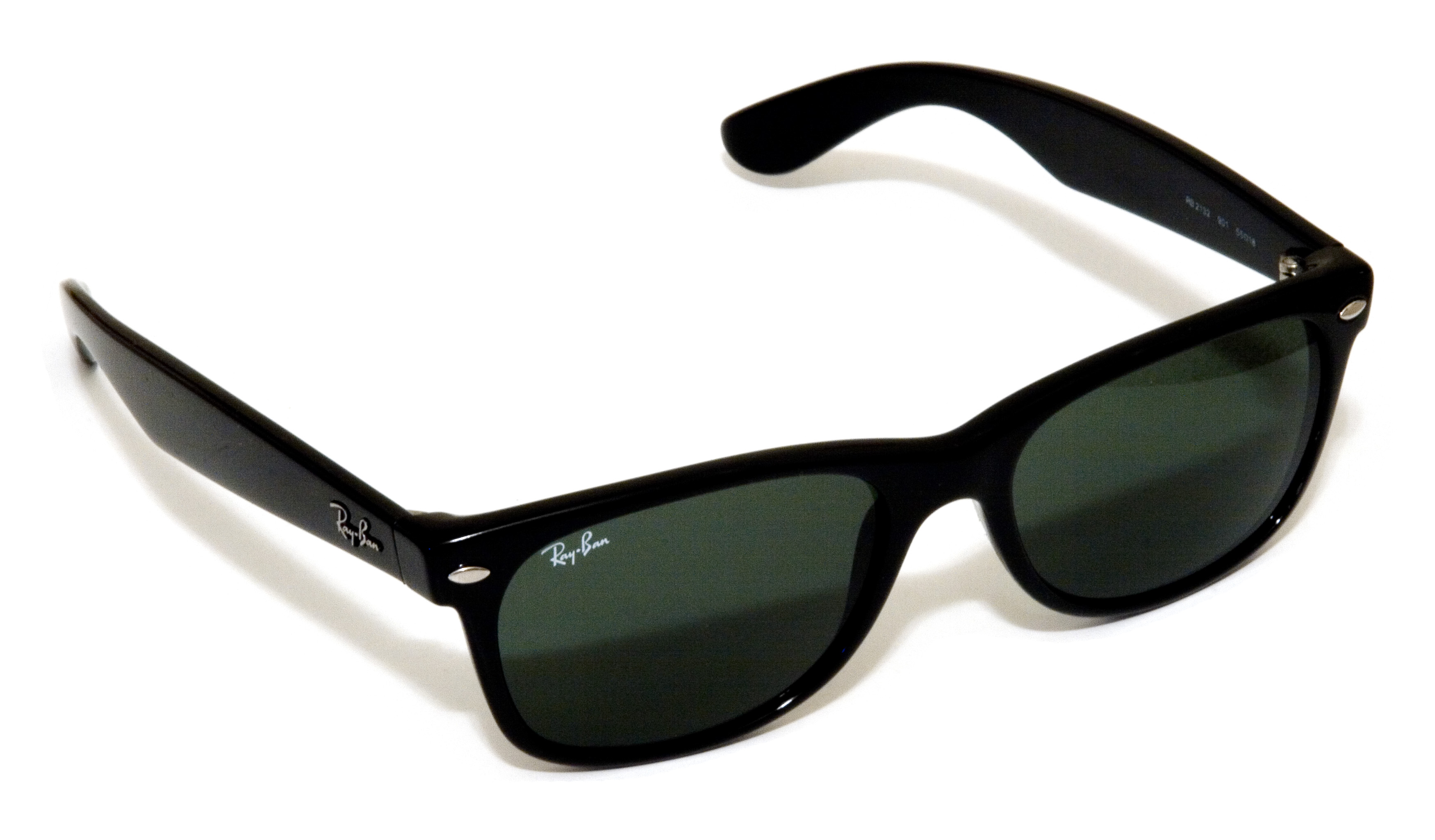
Ray-Ban New Wayfarer sunglasses (RB2132 901L)

Wayfarers were brought back into fashion in the late 2000s when public figures including Chloë Sevigny and Mary-Kate Olsen began wearing vintage frames. When Ray-Ban noticed that vintage Wayfarers were selling for significant prices on eBay, a 2007 re-introduction of the original Wayfarer (RB2140) design was initiated. The RB2140 model is identical to the original B&L5022 model, except the metal "studs" on the temple arms were replaced with the Ray-Ban logo and the right lens now bears the logo as well. (As of 2007, Wayfarers were available in Original Wayfarer, New Wayfarer, and Wayfarer Folding styles.) Ray-Ban's marketing strategy was threefold: a return to the sunglasses' original, rebellious design, an "edgy" advertising campaign and "high-profile PR events", and the use of new media like MySpace to connect with consumers. Sales in 2007 were 231% greater than in 2006 at Selfridge's London; as of October 2007, the Wayfarer was the Luxottica Group's third-best-selling style.

== 2020s ==
In September 2021, Ray-Ban and Facebook Reality Labs announced a collaboration for smart glasses including Wayfarers with built in cameras called Ray-Ban Stories.

== Similar designs and mistaken identity ==
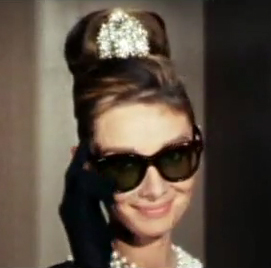
The sunglasses worn by Audrey Hepburn in Breakfast at Tiffany's, although often identified as Wayfarers, are actually "Manhattan" by Oliver Goldsmith.

During the 2000s Wayfarer revival, many sunglasses designs inspired by the original Wayfarers were produced by designers unaffiliated with Ray-Ban. Grey Ant's Grant Krajecki designed a larger, cartoonish version of the glasses "so extreme that [they] are best worn by those with a good sense of humor".

Other Wayfarer-inspired sunglasses included Oliver Peoples' Hollis, REM Eyewear's Converse, and various designs in Juicy Couture, Hugo Boss, Kate Spade, Marc Jacobs's and Kaenon Polarized 2008 lines. Between July and September 2008, retailers began selling frameless Wayfarers.

== Gallery ==
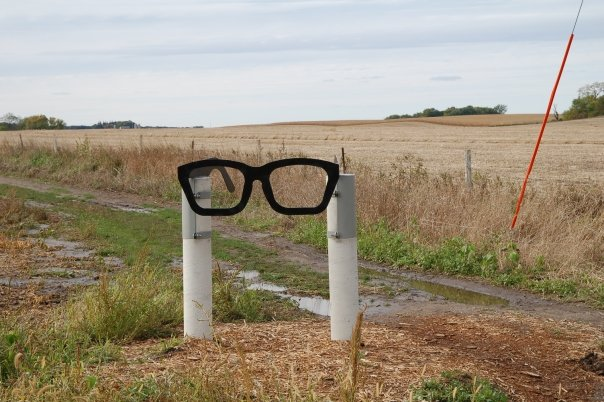
Signpost near the Clear Lake crash site where Buddy Holly died.

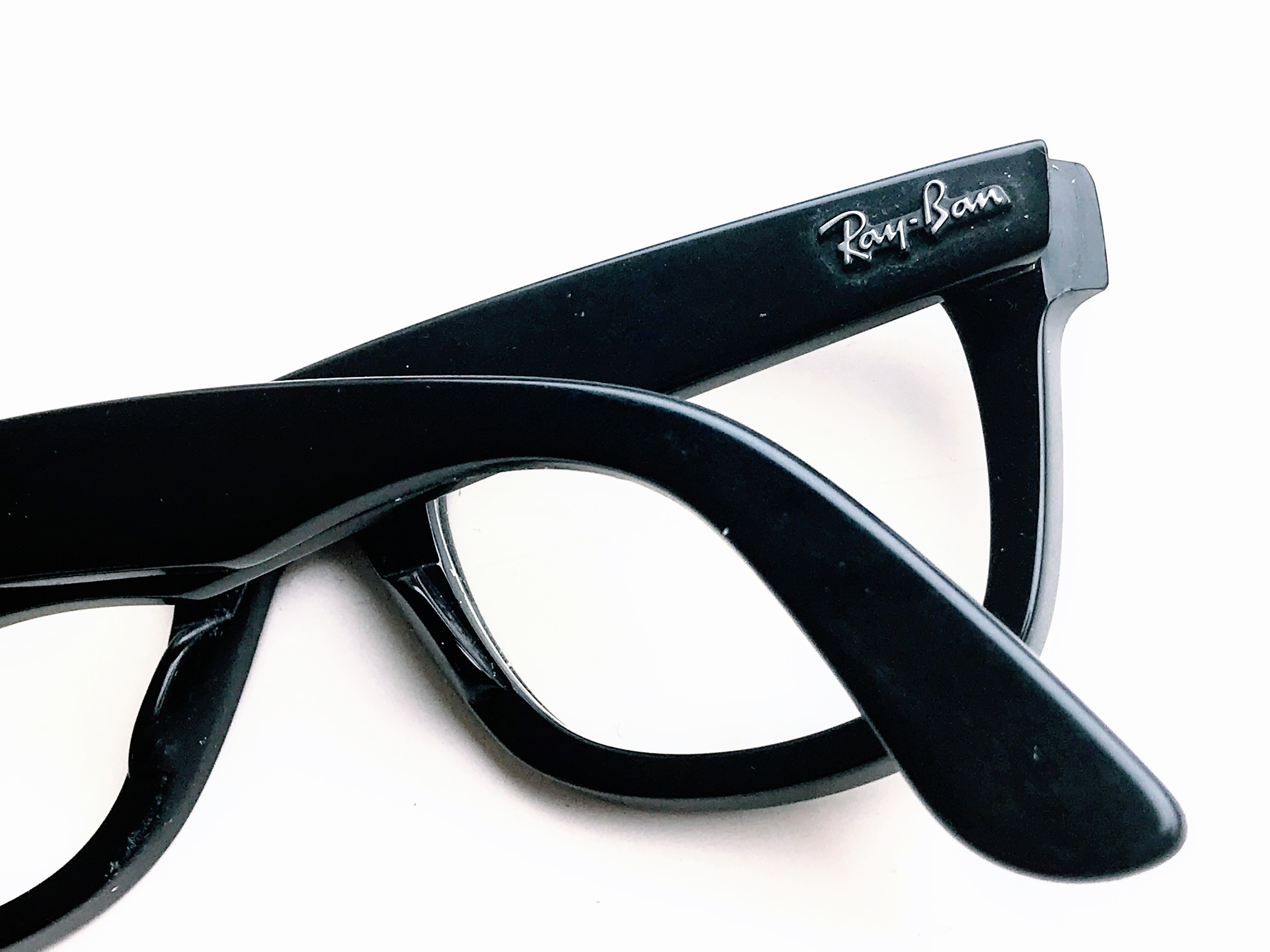
Ray-Ban logo on the Classic Wayfarer (RB5121)

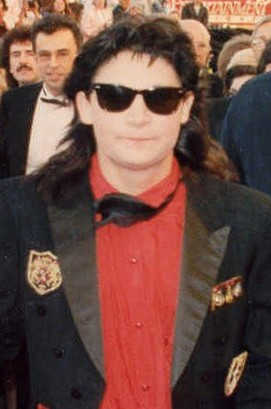
Actor Corey Feldman wearing Wayfarers at the Academy Awards, 1989
