= Gentle Monster Intelligent Eyewear =

Upcoming Android XR smart glasses collection

- Developer: Google and Samsung Electronics
- Type: Smart glasses
- Released: December 10, 2026 (scheduled)
- Platform: Android XR
- Online services: Gemini; Bixby (with Galaxy phones)
- Website: gentlemonster.com/us/en/intelligent-eyewear

Gentle Monster Intelligent Eyewear is an upcoming collection of Android XR smart glasses created through a collaboration between Gentle Monster, Google and Samsung Electronics. Gentle Monster designed the frames, while Samsung contributed hardware engineering and Google provided AI technology, including Gemini.

The first frame designs were previewed at Google I/O on May 19, 2026. Pre-orders opened on November 12, 2026, with release in South Korea and the United States scheduled for December 10.

== Background and development ==
Google announced Android XR in December 2024 as a platform for XR headsets and glasses, developed with Samsung and Qualcomm. In 2025, Google announced work with Samsung, Gentle Monster, and Warby Parker on Android XR smart glasses. The smart-glasses hardware is jointly developed by Google and Samsung, while Gentle Monster and Warby Parker are responsible for the frame designs.

== Announcement and release ==
At Google I/O 2026, the project was presented in two categories: audio glasses, which provide spoken assistance without a display, and display glasses, which show information in the user's line of sight. The audio models were scheduled to launch first and to pair with Android and iOS phones.

At Galaxy Unpacked on July 22, 2026, Samsung presented two additional frames and disclosed the first detailed hardware specifications for the audio models.

On November 12, 2026, Samsung announced a December 10 release for Gentle Monster Intelligent Eyewear in South Korea and the United States. Pre-orders began on the day of the announcement. Announced U.S. prices ranged from US$449 to US$489, depending on the model.

== Hardware and features ==
The glasses use the Snapdragon AR1 Gen 1 platform and do not contain a display. Samsung's November 2026 specifications list a 12-megapixel camera, two open-ear speakers, four microphones, 2 GB of memory and 64 GB of storage.

Samsung rates battery life at up to nine hours per charge and up to 72 hours with the charging case, depending on usage and operating conditions. The glasses support Gemini, with Bixby also available when paired with compatible Galaxy phones.

Announced functions include message summaries, spoken reading, live translation, navigation guidance, visual capture, note organization, live visual sharing and point-of-view recording. Some functions require a network connection, compatible devices or supported applications.

A front-facing LED indicates when the camera is recording, and recording is disabled if the indicator is covered or damaged. The glasses also have an inward-facing status indicator and use wear detection to disable recording when removed.

In July 2026, South Korea's Personal Information Protection Commission met with Samsung to discuss privacy-by-design measures for AI glasses, including recording indicators visible to nearby people.

== Design ==
The lineup announced in November 2026 comprised six frame designs offered in 16 variations, including different frame colours and lens options.

The camera and recording indicator are positioned on the front of the frame, while the speaker and microphone openings are located along the temples. A button is positioned on the right temple, with a power switch on the inner side of the left temple.

== Campaign ==
In November 2026, Gentle Monster released a teaser for a campaign film starring Joaquin Phoenix and directed by Jonathan Glazer. The company also announced a public preview in New York for November 13–23.

== See also ==
- Gentle Monster
- Google Glass
- Samsung Galaxy Glasses
- Ray-Ban Meta
