= Oblong =

An oblong is an object longer than it is wide, especially a non-square rectangle.

Oblong may also refer to:

== Places ==
- Oblong, Illinois, a village in the United States
- Oblong Township, Crawford County, Illinois, United States
- A strip of land on the New York-Connecticut border in the United States nicknamed the "Oblong", running north from the Connecticut panhandle

== Other uses ==
- Oblong (company), an American a cloud-based communication service provider
- Oblong Industries, a spin-off of the MIT Media Lab
- Angus Oblong, American author and actor born David Walker (born 1976)
- The Oblongs, a short-lived 2001 American animated television program co-created by Angus Oblong
- Bob Oblong, a character in The Shapies, an Australian animated children's television series
- Oblong, a leaf shape
