= Golden-i =

Golden-i Headsets
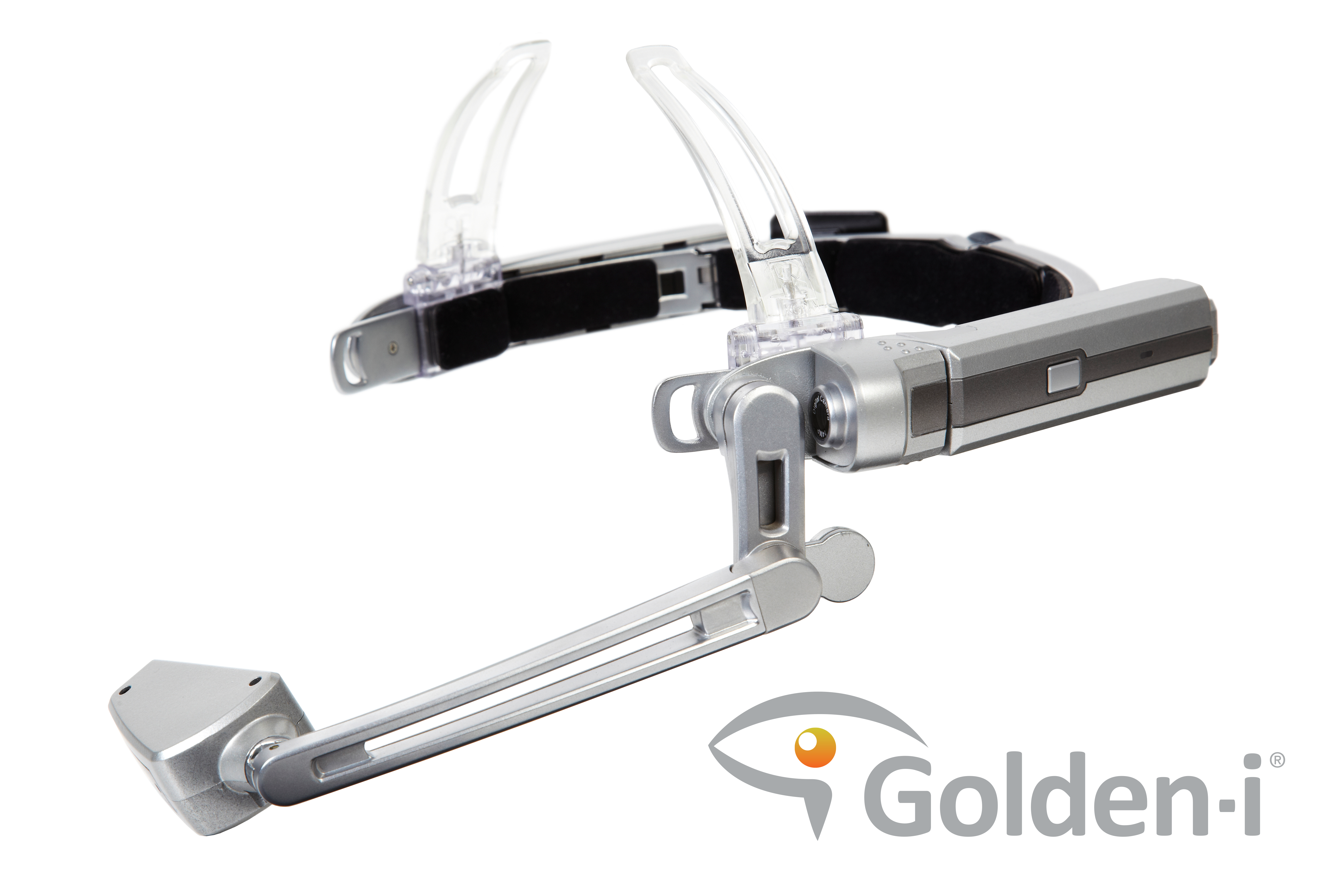
- Brand: Golden-i Headset Computers
- Manufacturer: Kopin Corporation
- First released: 2013
- Operating system: Windows CE 6 R3
- CPU: TI OMAP 600Mhz
- Removable storage: microSD
- Display: Kopin CyberDisplay SVGA
- Connectivity: 2.1 + EDR Wi-Fi

The Golden-i platform consists of multiple mobile wireless wearable headset computers operated by voice commands and head movements. It was developed at Kopin Corporation by a team led by Jeffrey Jacobsen, chief Golden-i architect and senior advisor to the CEO. Utilizing a speech controlled user interface and head-tracking functionality, Golden-i enables the user to carry out common computer functions whilst keeping their hands free.

== Specifications ==
Golden-i headsets feature a qHD microdisplay manufactured by Kopin Corporation which can be adjusted to be used below the left or right eye, 9-axis head-tracking technology with a digital compass and GPS, speech recognition software with two noise-cancelling microphones (supporting 38 languages), Bluetooth, Wi-Fi and USB connectivity, 3D graphics accelerators. The 18650 Li-ion battery will last 8+ hours. The latest Golden-i Gen 3.8 headset computer also has built-in 14MP camera.

== Headsets ==
=== Gen 3.8 ===
Verizon Wireless announced the Golden-i Wireless Headset (3.8 or Gen 3.8) at CES 2013 on January 8, 2013. Designed by Kopin Corporation to function over Verizon's 4G LTE network, the Gen 3.8 headset is the lightest Golden-i headset to date, weighing 4.5 ounces in its lightest configuration. The boom structure and metallization within the device is a magnesium copper titanium alloy with Lexan polycarbonate shell – designed to operate under various different temperatures. Golden-i 3.8 can be worn with a hard hat or helmet and has a basic adjustment in the back that compensates for the width and length of people's heads for comfort. Kopin and Verizon are in the process of building thousands of Gen 3.8 headsets to bring to market and are targeting light industrial industries.

=== HC1 ===
Launched at the Association of the United States Army (AUSA) Annual Meeting & Exposition by Motorola Solutions, the HC1 was built to withstand harsh conditions and rough handling - helping to improve productivity and accuracy in environments where carrying a laptop is not feasible, safe, or convenient. Designed to be mounted onto a hard hat or other safety equipment, the HC1 allows field technicians hands-free access to schematics and other important data while servicing systems in remote locations.

=== Gen 3.5 ===
In 2011, Kopin Corporation announced the FCC certification and availability of Golden-i Gen 3.5 headset computers. Designed as a developer unit for software application developers and select Motorola enterprise and public safety customers, the Gen 3.5 was sold with Development Kits for $2,500 (plus tax and shipping). Each Development Kit included one Golden-i Gen 3.5 headset, a Windows 7 application software emulation environment; Microsoft WinCE 6 application software porting platform; Nuance Vocon3200 Golden-i speech recognition platform available in more than 20 languages; online professional application development and support provided by Adeneo, a Microsoft Gold Developer Partner; access to the global Golden-i users group; a second Li-ion battery and wall-plug battery charger; a user's guide; and a developers instruction manual.

== Software ==
Ikanos Consulting, a wholly owned Kopin subsidiary working with [Mistral Solutions] developed the Golden-i operating system (Gi-OS) to support Golden-i headset computers. Gi-OS includes a high performance hardware accelerated graphics subsystem, built using OpenGL, allowing support for transparencies and transition animations to create and stylize voice-controlled applications for Golden-i. There is also a Gi-OS SDK available for Golden-i –providing software developers the tools to create their own applications for Golden-i. Gi-OS provides a set of core applications including a media player, file explorer, and web browser.

Input mechanisms include voice, head tracking, Ask Ziggy Inc., and voice driven keyboards. Ikanos Consulting announced at CES 2013 its LifeBoard application for Golden-i – a skin for Gi-OS that enables the user to customize up to 6 different screens and navigate between them using voice commands.

Ikanos Consulting also created a range of professional software applications for various industries called the Pro Series. These include Firefighter Pro (as seen on the Verizon Powerful Answers - "The Brave :60" Commercial), Police Pro and Paramedic Pro.

== See also ==
- EyeTap – eye-mounted camera and head-up display (HUD)
- Google Glass - wearable computer with optical see-through display
- Google Goggles – query-by-image search engine
- Looxcie – ear-mounted streaming video camera
- Oculus Rift – wide field of view virtual reality (VR) goggles with low latency head tracking
- SixthSense – wearable AR device
