= Gentle Monster =

South Korean eyewear brand

- Native name: 젠틀몬스터
- Type: Public
- Industry: Eyewear
- Founded: 2011; 15 years ago in Seoul, South Korea
- Founder: Hankook Kim
- Headquarters: Seoul, South Korea
- Area served: Worldwide
- Products: Sunglasses; Eyeglasses
- Parent: II Combined
- Website: gentlemonster.com

Gentle Monster (Korean: 젠틀몬스터, stylized in all caps) is a South Korean brand of luxury sunglasses and eyeglasses founded in 2011. Gentle Monster is owned by parent company IICOMBINED, which also operates the fragrance brand Tamburins, dessert brand NUDAKE, headwear brand ATiiSSU, and tableware brand Nuflaat.

As of 2026, Gentle Monster operates 84 stores worldwide, and its products are available through over 450 retailers in 30 countries.

Gentle Monster has also collaborated with Google and Samsung Electronics on Gentle Monster Intelligent Eyewear, a collection of Android XR smart glasses incorporating Google's Gemini assistant.

== Retail spaces ==
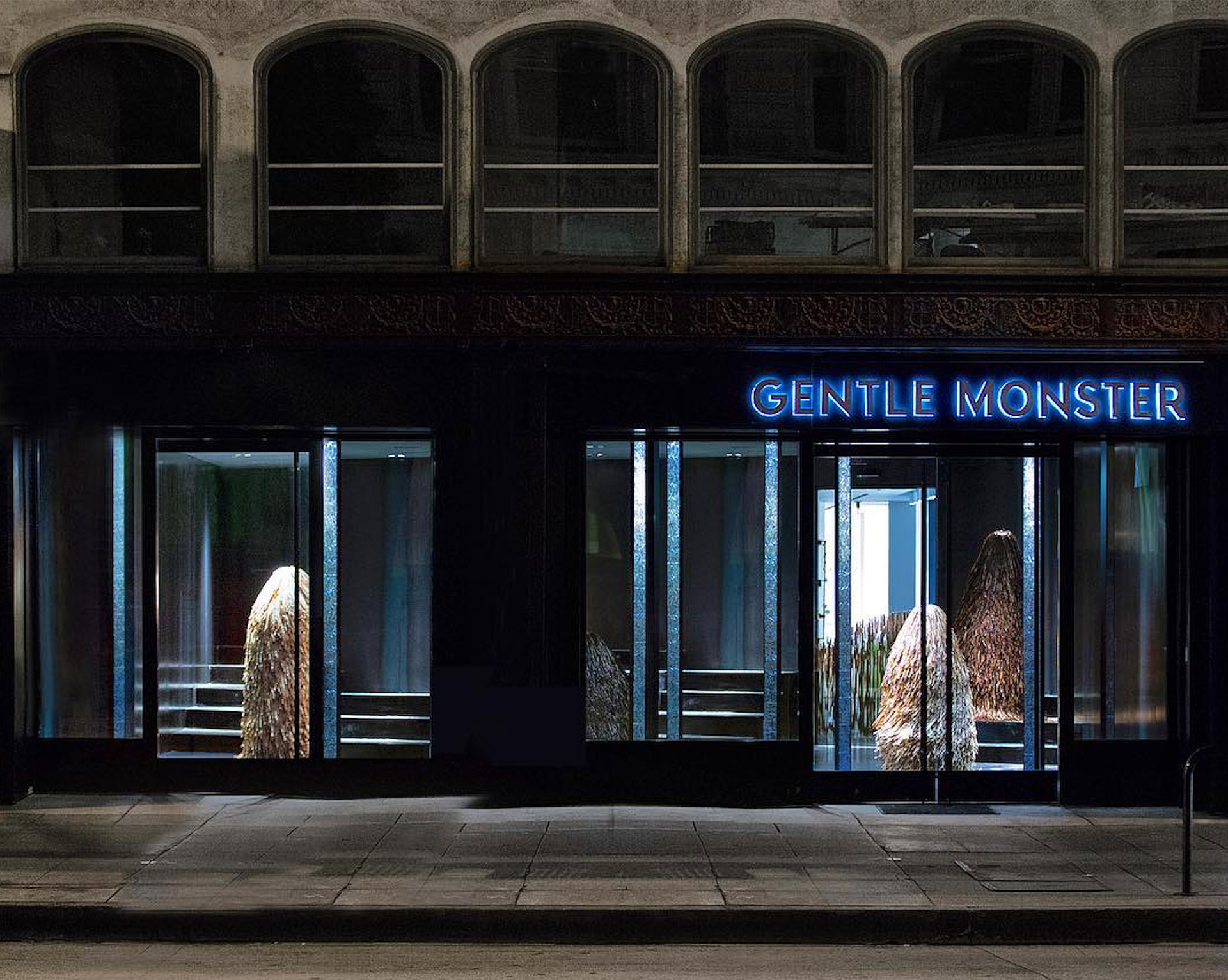
Gentle Monster store in Los Angeles

Gentle Monster's retail spaces incorporate iconic large-scale installations, sculptures, and themed environments. Its parent company IICOMBINED launched the HAUS retail concept in 2021 with HAUS DOSAN in Seoul and HAUS SHANGHAI, followed by HAUS NOWHERE SHENZHEN in 2024.

Robotic and kinetic sculptures have appeared in several Gentle Monster stores. The London flagship featured martial-arts-themed robots that were activated every three minutes. HAUS DOSAN featured The Probe, a six-legged robot developed over more than a year by Gentle Monster's Robotics Lab. At HAUS SHANGHAI, a robotic face created by the lab took a year to develop.

In 2025, the company opened HAUS NOWHERE SEOUL, a mixed-use headquarters and retail complex in Seoul that houses Gentle Monster alongside Tamburins, ATiiSSU, NUDAKE, and Nuflaat.

In December 2025, HAUS NOWHERE BANGKOK opened at Iconsiam as the fifth location in the series. It includes a Gentle Monster store and the first Tamburins flagship in Southeast Asia.

== History ==
Serial entrepreneur Jae Wook Oh invested about $100,000 in 2012 and Gentle Monster began producing frames in Daegu, which had been a manufacturing hub for Luxottica, and China, since acetate frames are illegal to produce in South Korea. The brand's designs favor oversized frames that are much larger than those by Western brands because its Asian clientele prefer frames that create the image of a smaller face.

In 2013 and 2014, Korean actress Jun Ji-hyun wore Gentle Monster lenses on My Love From the Star, which increased the brand's exposure to a mainstream audience.

In February 2016, the company's first US store opened on Grand Street in SoHo, New York City. Its second US store opened in downtown Los Angeles in October 2017. French luxury goods conglomerate LVMH invested $60 million for a 7% stake in the company in September 2017.

In 2025, Google was reported to have agreed to invest approximately $100 million for a 4% stake in Gentle Monster as part of its partnership with the company to develop Android XR smart glasses, which were expected to launch in 2026.

== Pricing ==
On average, a pair of sunglasses or glasses ranges from $200 to $300 depending on frames, lenses, and prescription. Prices do fluctuate and can be as high as $500.

== Marketing and collaborations ==
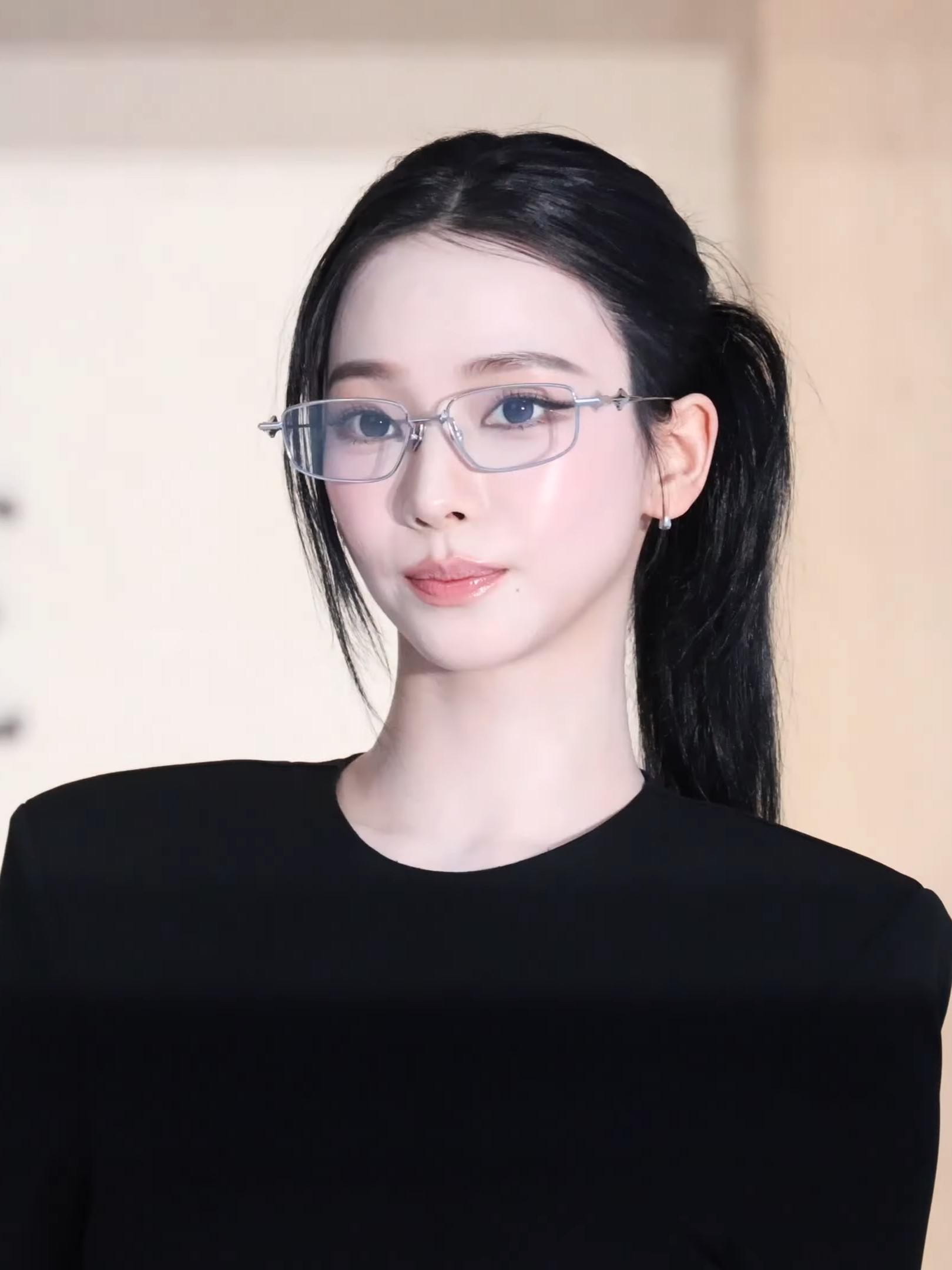
Karina at HAUS NOWHERE Seoul in 2025

Items are all limited edition. Once sold out, restocks or repeat items are not guaranteed.

Gentle Monster has collaborated with a variety of designers and celebrities over the years to produce special collections. In 2016, the brand partnered with Danish designer Henrik Vibskov, Hood by Air, and Opening Ceremony. Actress Tilda Swinton designed three pairs of sunglasses with the brand in February 2017 and appeared in an accompanying ad campaign video. That year also saw a collaboration with Dutch furniture designer Marcel Wanders, the founder of Moooi, as well as a showing at New York Fashion Week.

In 2018, the brand collaborated on the Burning Planet exhibition with South Korean rapper Song Mino of Winner. The following year, Gentle Monster released smartglasses in collaboration with Chinese technology company Huawei.

In 2020, the brand collaborated with singer Jennie Kim of Blackpink to release the Jentle Home collection, and the Canadian former rapper Kris Wu for the release of the Gentle Wu collection. The brand has since released two more collections with Kim, in 2022 (Jentle Garden) (Note: A mobile game was developed in promotion of Jentle Garden, while pop-up stores were opened in Seoul, Los Angeles, Hong Kong, Singapore, and Shanghai, respectively.) and 2024 (Jentle Salon).

In 2023, the brand collaborated with Chinese singer Cai Xukun to release his Crystal Clear collection. An event app was developed for the collaboration which was available in mainland China, Taiwan, Hong Kong, South Korea, Dubai, Singapore, Japan, and the United States, with pop-ups organised in Shanghai and Beijing.

In 2024, Gentle Monster collaborated with French luxury fashion house Maison Margiela on the "2024 Maison Margiela x Gentle Monster" collection. The same year, Gentle Monster collaborated with the video game Tekken 8, launching the "Gentle Monster x Tekken 8" collection inspired by characters from the game.

In March 2025, Gentle Monster and Maison Margiela released their third collaborative eyewear collection, which comprised 20 designs.

In 2025, the brand collaborated with Bratz featuring Aespa's Karina. The pocket collection included 21 designs with one collaborative eyepiece accompanied by a custom Bratz doll. To celebrate the collection, the brand opened up pop-up stores in 4 cities: Los Angeles, Seoul, Shanghai, and Bangkok, from May to October.

In 2026, Gentle Monster released the Circuit collection in collaboration with Disney and Formula One. In May, the brand introduced the Veggie Collection, a ten-style folding eyewear collection accompanied by a campaign featuring Karina of Aespa. In July, Gentle Monster and Prada launched their first joint eyewear collection, consisting of three designs sold in select Asian markets. In September, the brand renovated its flagship store in SoHo, Manhattan, New York City. The redesigned store introduced Glossy Head Kinetic, a reinterpretation of the brand's Giant Head Kinetic installation, and was presented as a space showcasing Gentle Monster's design and artistic identity alongside its eyewear products. In October, Gentle Monster and Maison Margiela announced their fourth eyewear collaboration, with an October 29 release date. The collection comprised 43 sunglasses and 25 optical frames and used deconstruction as its design theme. An accompanying campaign film was directed by Alex Prager.

Additional collaborations include, but are not limited to the video games Overwatch 2 and World of Warcraft, the fashion brands D'heygere, Moncler, and Fendi, and designer Alexander Wang.

=== Intelligent eyewear ===
In May 2025, Google announced a smart-glasses partnership with Samsung, Gentle Monster and Warby Parker. Gentle Monster contributed frame design, alongside Samsung's hardware engineering and Google's AI technology. The first frame designs were previewed at Google I/O in May 2026. A second Gentle Monster frame was presented at Galaxy Unpacked in July.

In November 2026, Gentle Monster released a teaser for a campaign film starring Joaquin Phoenix and directed by Jonathan Glazer. Pre-orders for the collection opened on November 12, with release in South Korea and the United States scheduled for December 10.

== See also ==
- Gentle Monster Intelligent Eyewear
- Ray-Ban
- Persol
- Warby Parker
- Oliver Goldsmith
- Blue Elephant
