= Ray-Ban =

Eyewear company owned by EssilorLuxottica

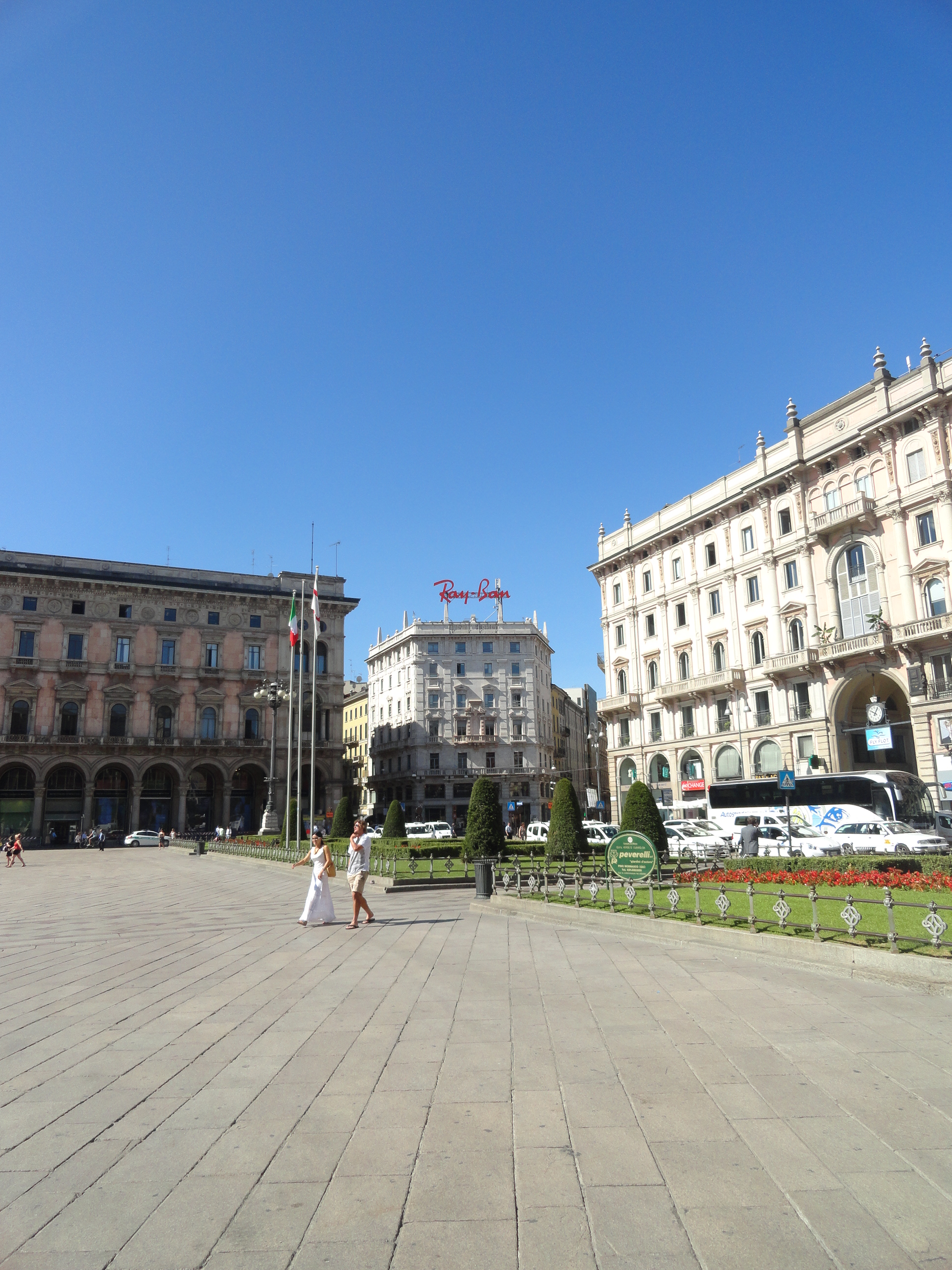
- Headquarters in Milan, Italy
- Type: Subsidiary
- Industry: Eyewear
- Founded: 1936; 90 years ago in Rochester, New York, United States
- Headquarters: Milan, Italy
- Area served: Worldwide
- Key people: ASAP Rocky (creative director)
- Products: Sunglasses; Glasses; Smartglasses
- Parent: Luxottica Group
- Website: ray-ban.com

Ray-Ban is an American Italian-owned brand of luxury sunglasses and standard glasses created in 1936 by Canadian international company Bausch & Lomb. The brand is most notable for its Wayfarer and Aviator lines of sunglasses. In 1999, Bausch & Lomb sold the brand to Italian eyewear conglomerate Luxottica Group for a reported $640 million.

== History ==
In 1929, US Army Air Corps Colonel John A. Macready worked with Bausch & Lomb, a Rochester, New York–based medical equipment manufacturer, to create aviation sunglasses that would reduce the distraction for pilots caused by the intense blue and white hues of the sky.

Specifically, Macready was concerned that pilots' goggles would fog up, greatly reducing visibility at high altitude. The prototype, created in 1936 and known as "Anti-Glare", had plastic frames and green lenses that could cut out the glare without obscuring vision. The name "Ray-Ban" was hence derived from the ability of these glasses to limit the ingress of either ultra-violet or infra-red rays of light. Impact-resistant lenses were added in 1938. The sunglasses were redesigned with a metal frame the following year and patented as the Ray-Ban Aviator. According to the BBC, the glasses used "Kalichrome lenses designed to sharpen details and minimise haze by filtering out blue light, making them ideal for misty conditions."

In 2025, rapper ASAP Rocky was appointed the brand's first-ever creative director.

On September 17, 2025, Ray-Ban along with Meta Corporation announced the Meta Ray-Ban Display, their first ever augmented reality glasses.

== Product lines ==
Ray-Ban's most popular sunglasses are the Wayfarer, Erika, and Aviator models. During the 1950s, Ray-Ban released the Echelon (Caravan), which had a squarer frame. In 1965, the Olympian I and II were introduced; they became popular when Peter Fonda wore them in the 1969 film Easy Rider. The company has also produced special edition lines, such as The General in 1987, bearing similarity to the original aviators worn by General Douglas MacArthur during the Second World War. In the 1980s the Ray-Ban Clubmaster was added to the model line. The Clubmaster has a browline frame and went on to become the third best selling sunglasses style of the 1980s, behind the Wayfarer and Aviator.

In 2007, Luxottica Group launched Ray-Ban Youth, a collection of prescription eyewear aimed at children ages eight through twelve.

In 2021, Ray-Ban commercialized a model of smart glasses that they developed with Facebook Reality Labs called Ray-Ban Stories. Building on recent trends of wearable technology, the glasses feature a built-in camera and Bluetooth earphones. Like other wearable, camera-equipped tech, Ray-Ban Stories have come under scrutiny for their susceptibility to privacy issues and potential for misuse.

== Counterfeits ==
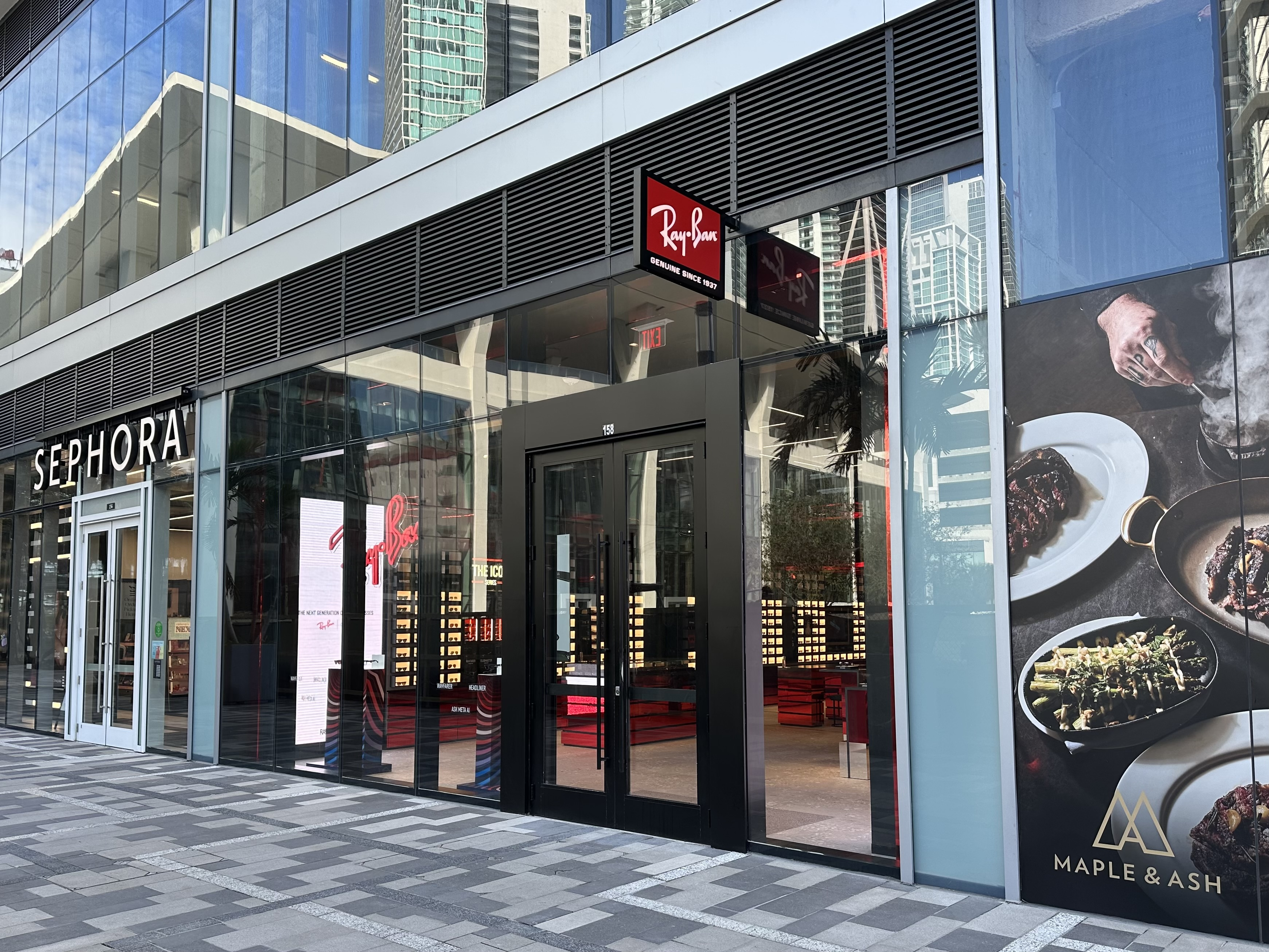
Ray-Ban store in Miami, Florida

Like other luxury brands, Ray-Ban has been a notable target for retail counterfeiters. The advertisement of Ray-Bans for unrealistically low prices has been consistently linked to fraudulent websites peddling counterfeit products. Studies have shown that one of every four ads for discounted luxury products on Facebook links users to such sites. Ray-Bans are often involved in international seizures of counterfeit designer goods. For one example, in 2016, law enforcement in Thailand seized an alleged import of hundreds of thousands of counterfeit sunglasses including Ray-Bans and Oakleys (also owned by Luxottica Group). Counterfeiters were said to have applied tags and stickers to the fakes to deceive consumers about their authenticity.

Luxottica has taken measures to thwart the trade of counterfeit products, such as converting the India Ray-Ban website from a reference site to a functional e-commerce platform, and pursuing legal action against online retailers that market fake Ray-Ban products. In 2016, Luxottica introduced a "Minimum Advertised Price (MAP)" policy for Ray-Ban in contracts with their wholesale customers. While the policy does not name a specific minimum price point, it forbids the advertisement of Ray-Ban products at extreme discounts, as well as any advertising that could otherwise devalue the products.

== Gallery ==
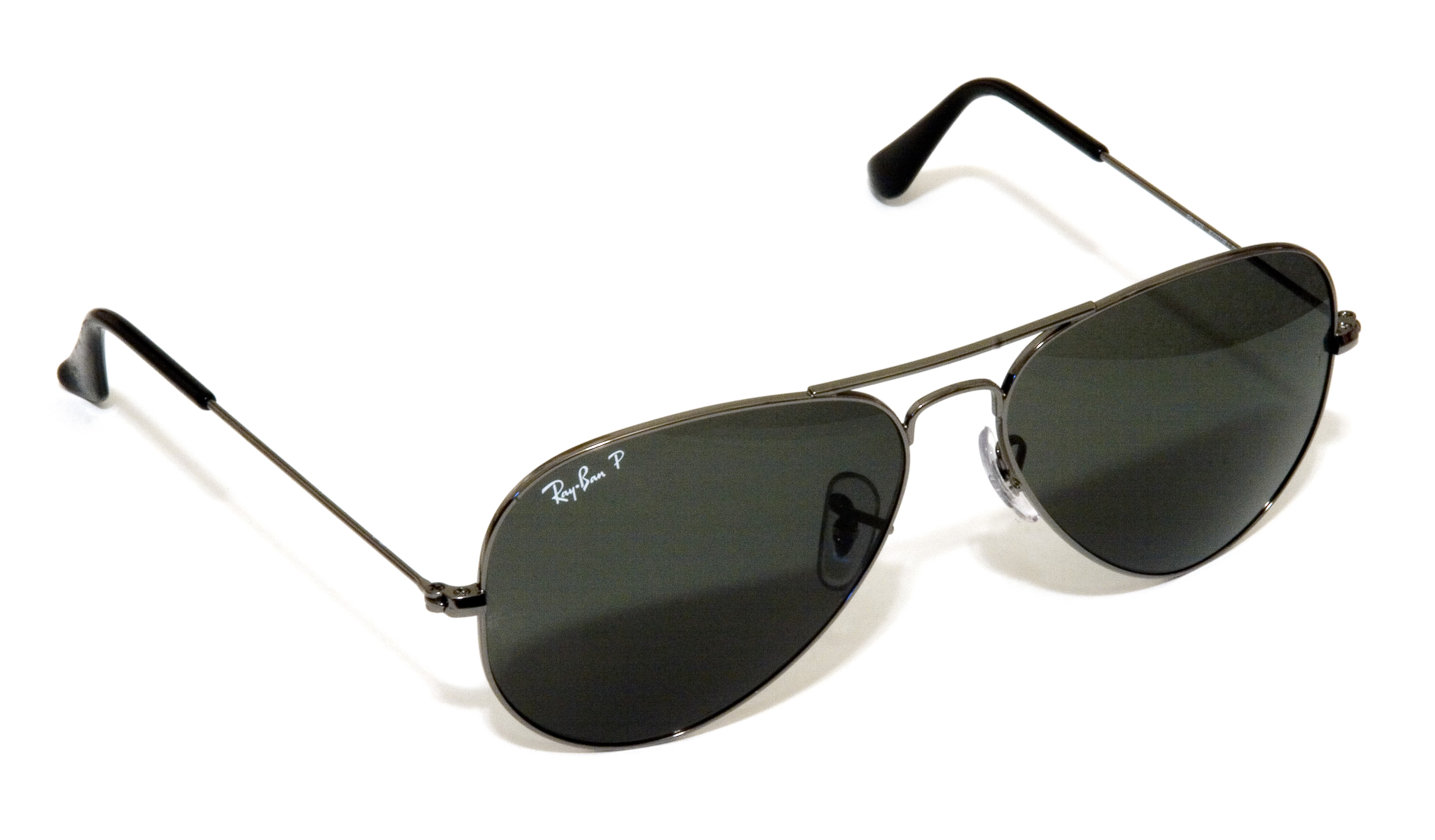
Ray-Ban 3025 Large Metal Aviator (polarized lenses)

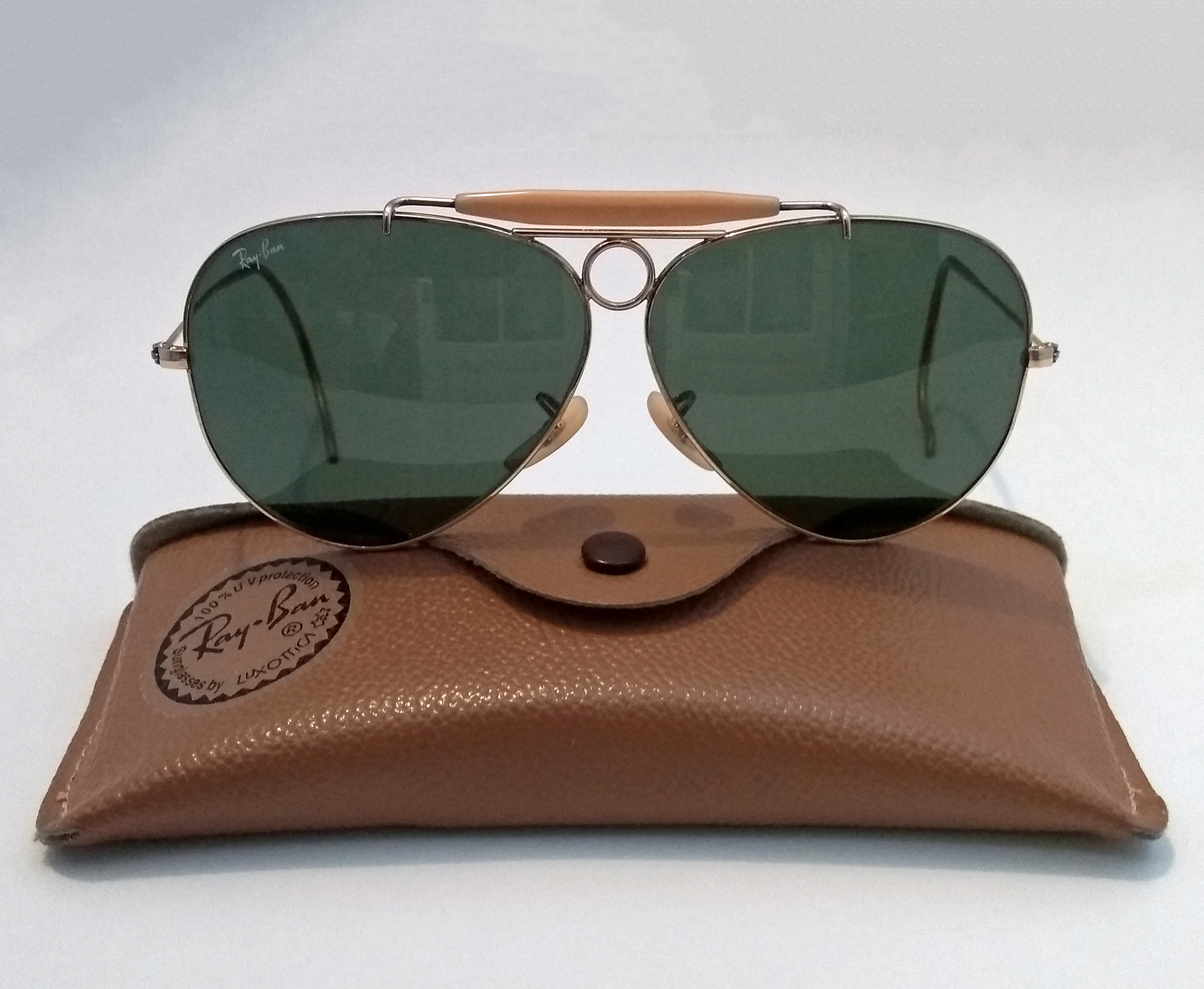
Ray-Ban 3139 Shooter (G-15 lenses)

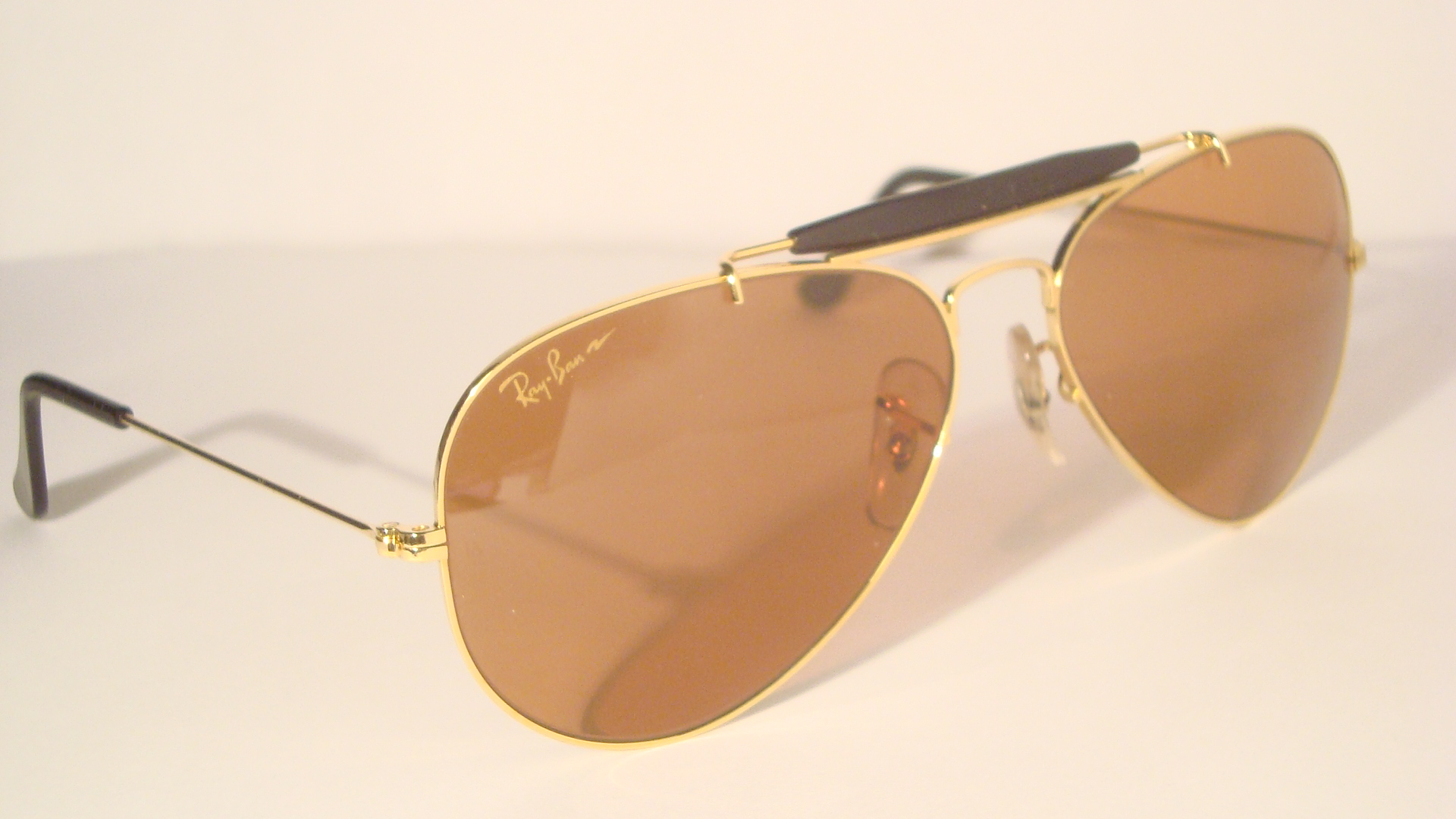
Ray-Ban W163 Outdoorsman (B-20 Chromax lenses)

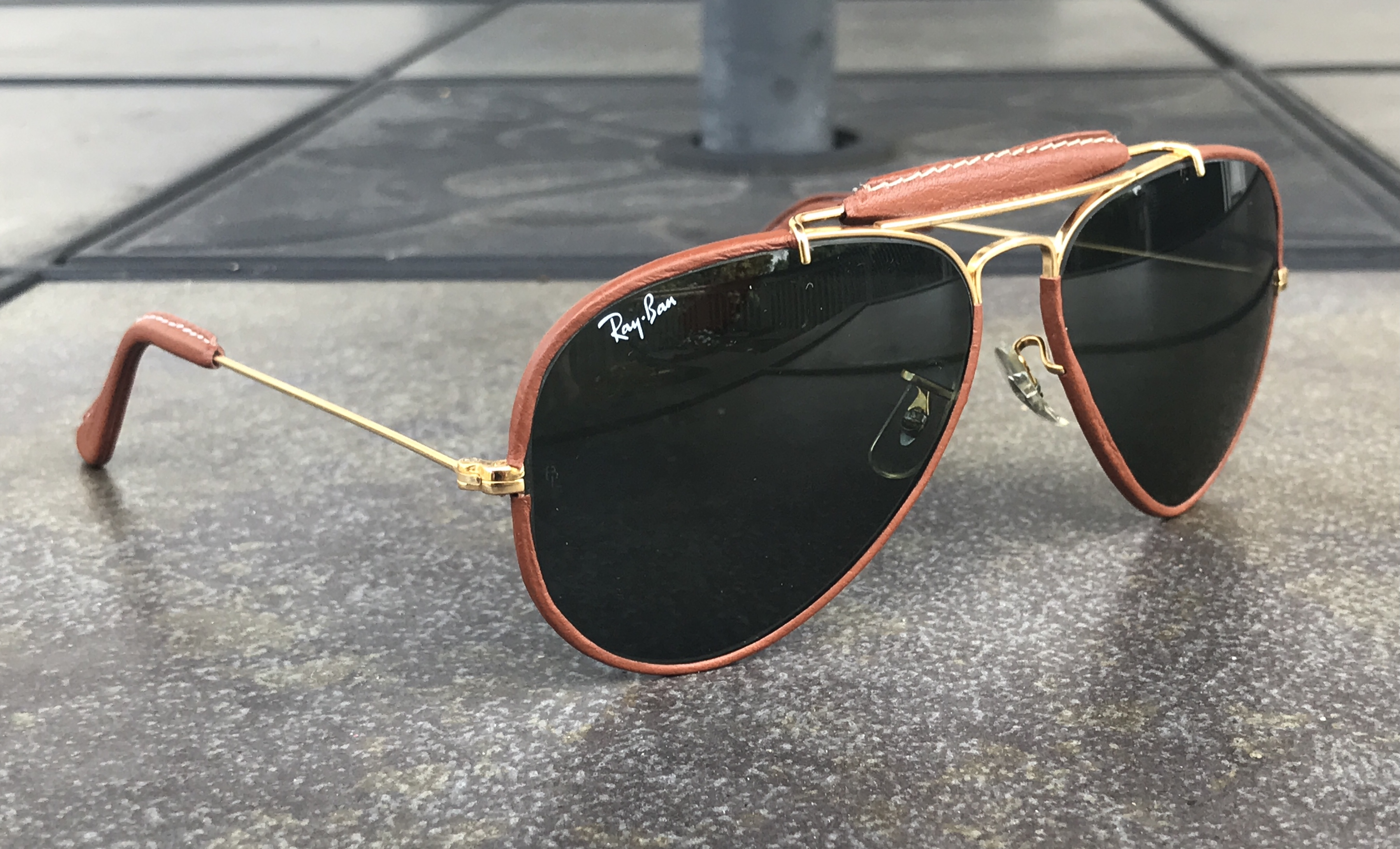
Ray-Ban Leathers Outdoorsman II (G-15 lenses)

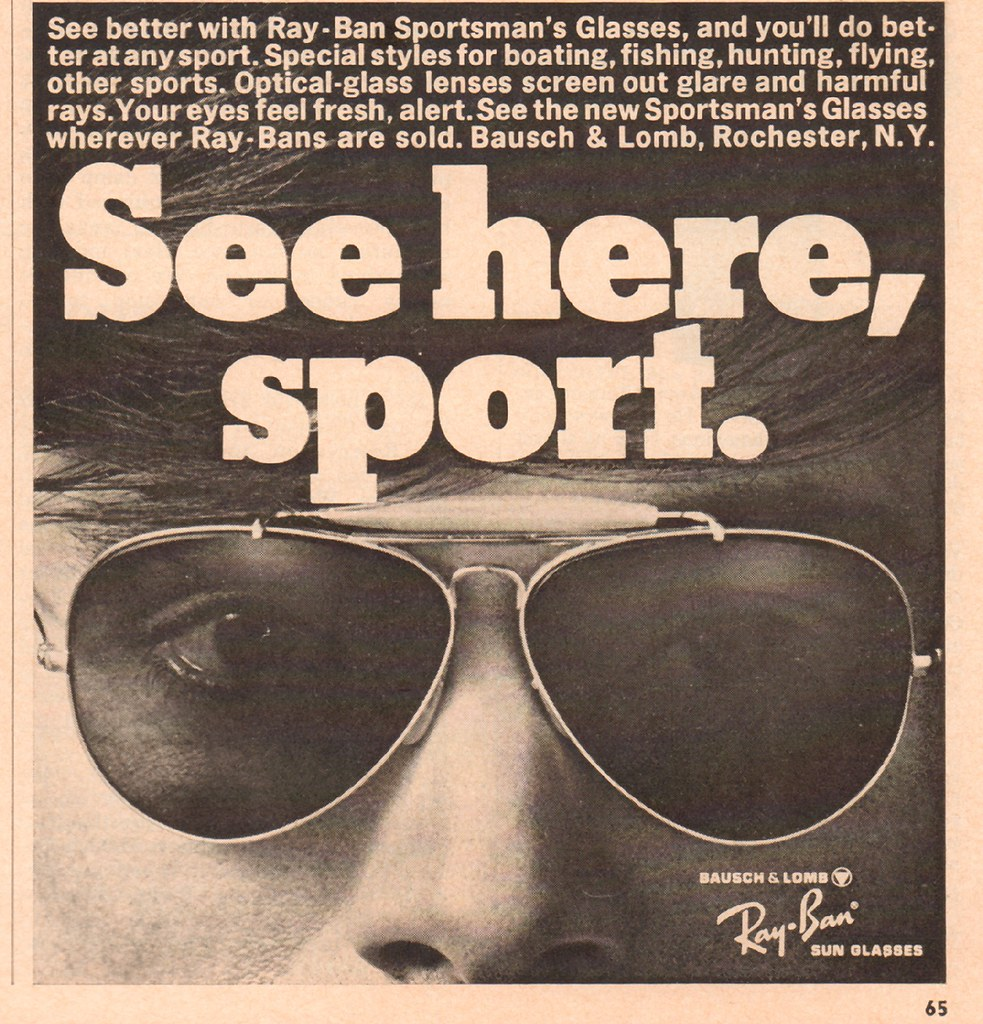
1968 Ray-Ban Outdoorsman advertisement

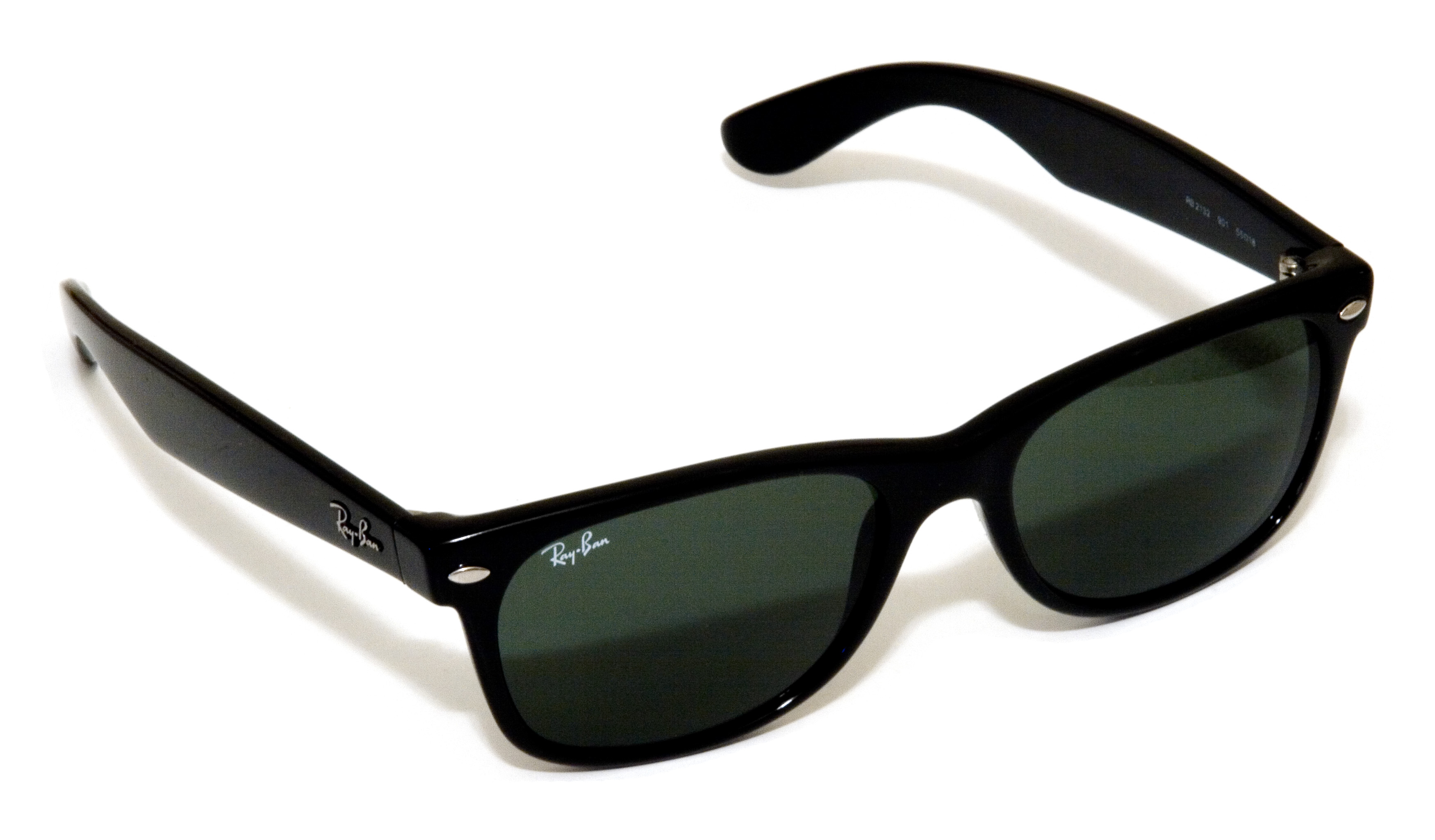
Ray-Ban 2132 901L Wayfarer

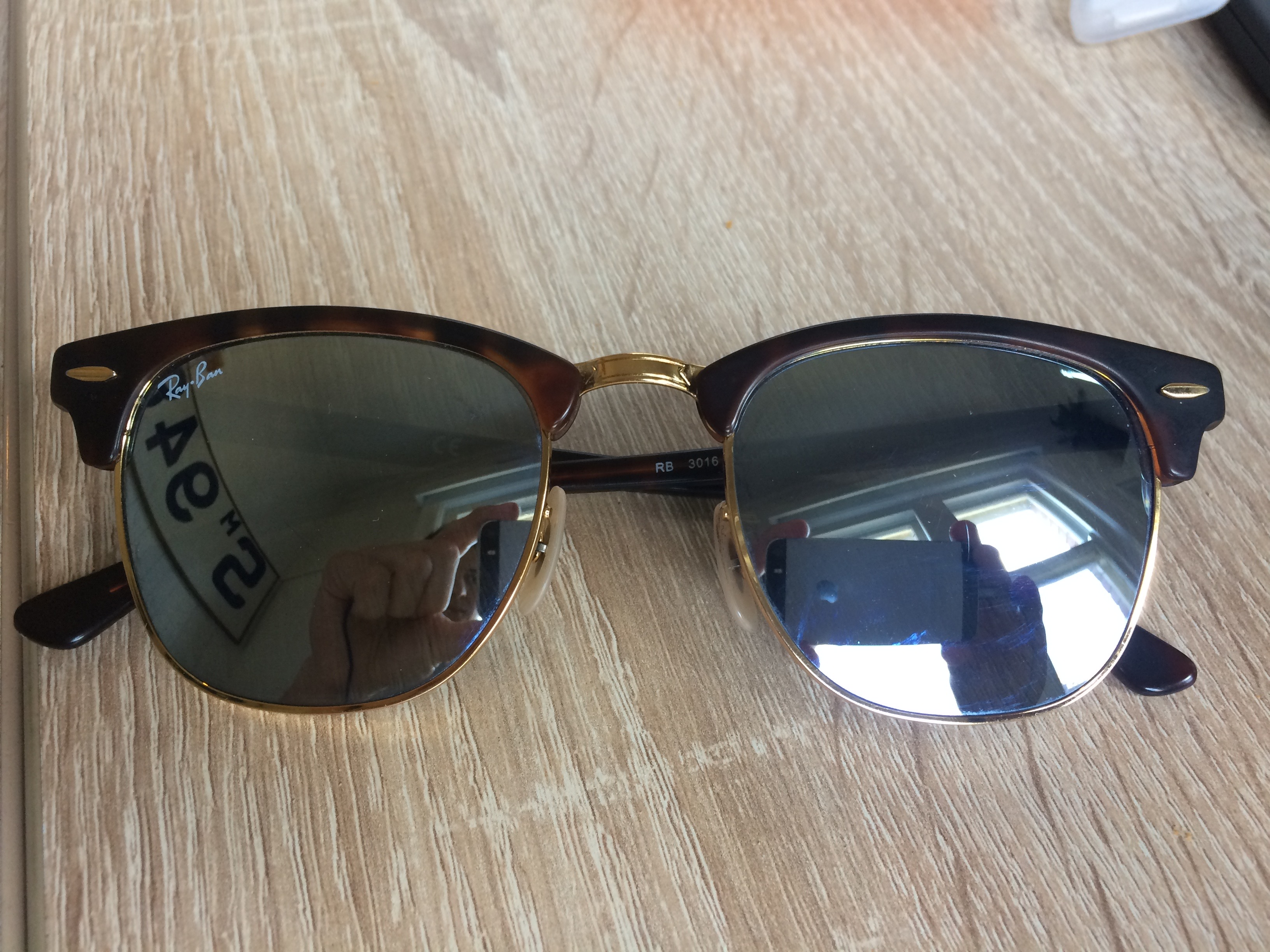
Ray-Ban 3016 Clubmaster

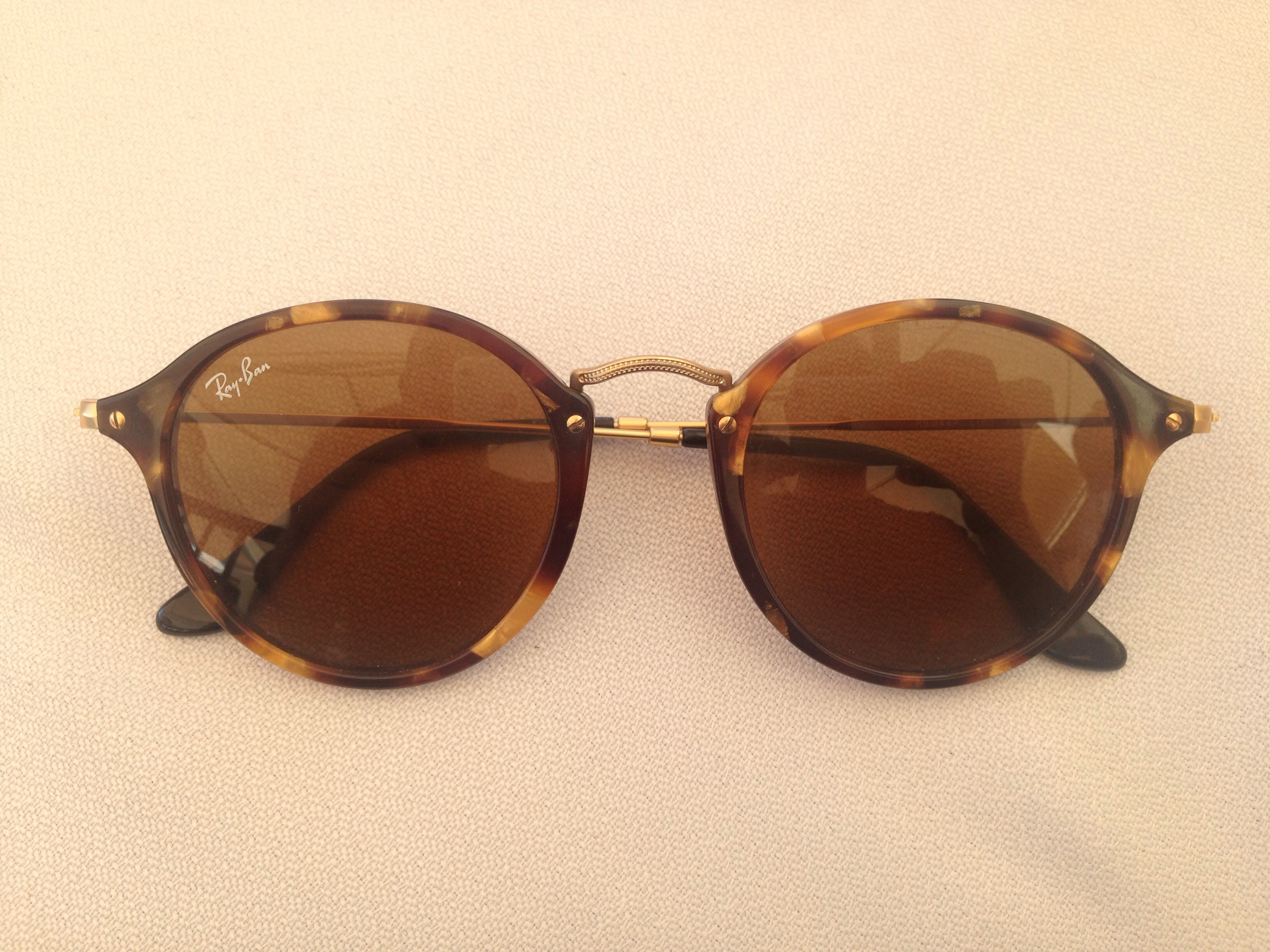
Ray-Ban 2447 Round Fleck Icons

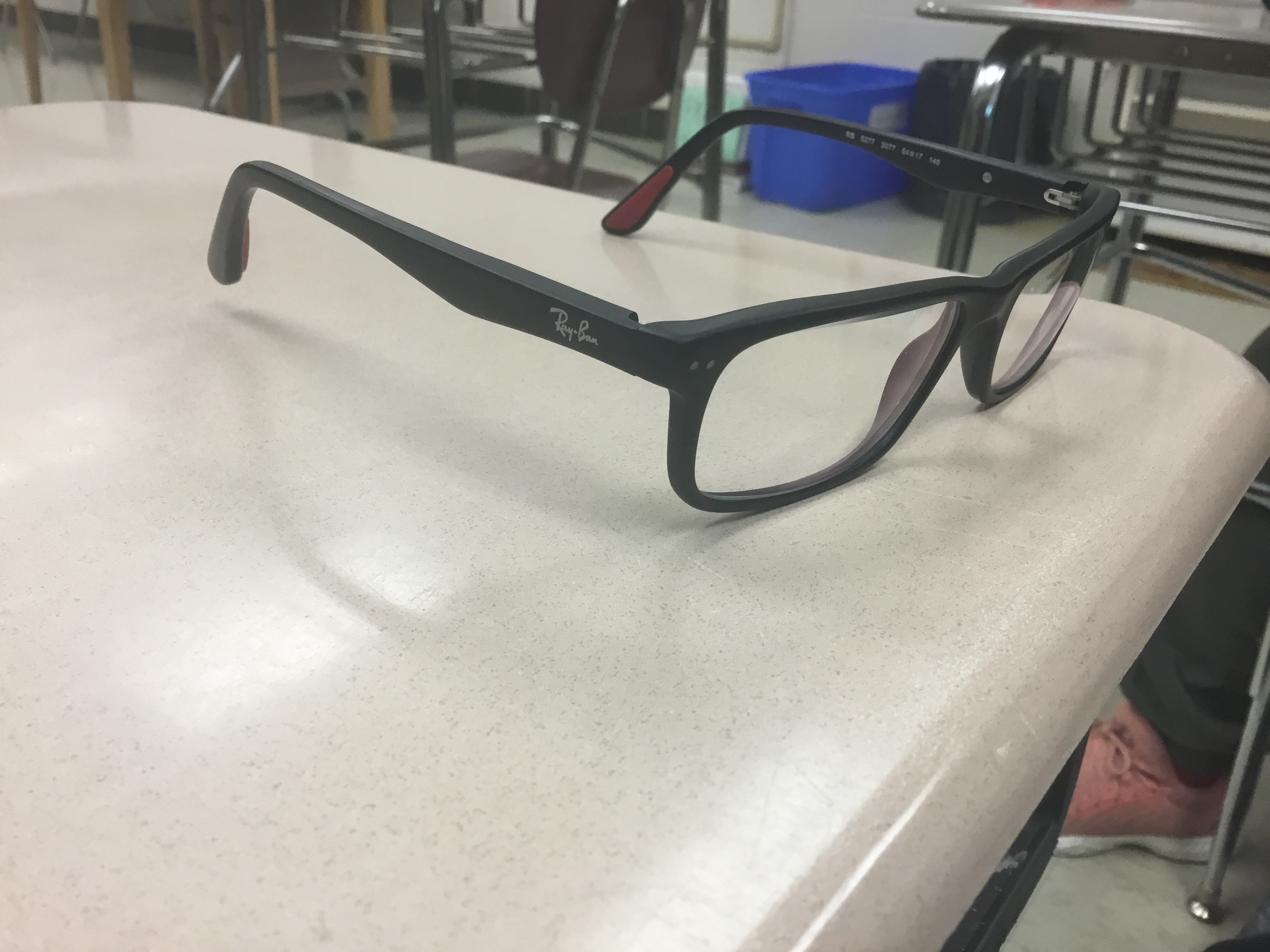
Ray-Ban 5277 prescription eyeglasses frame

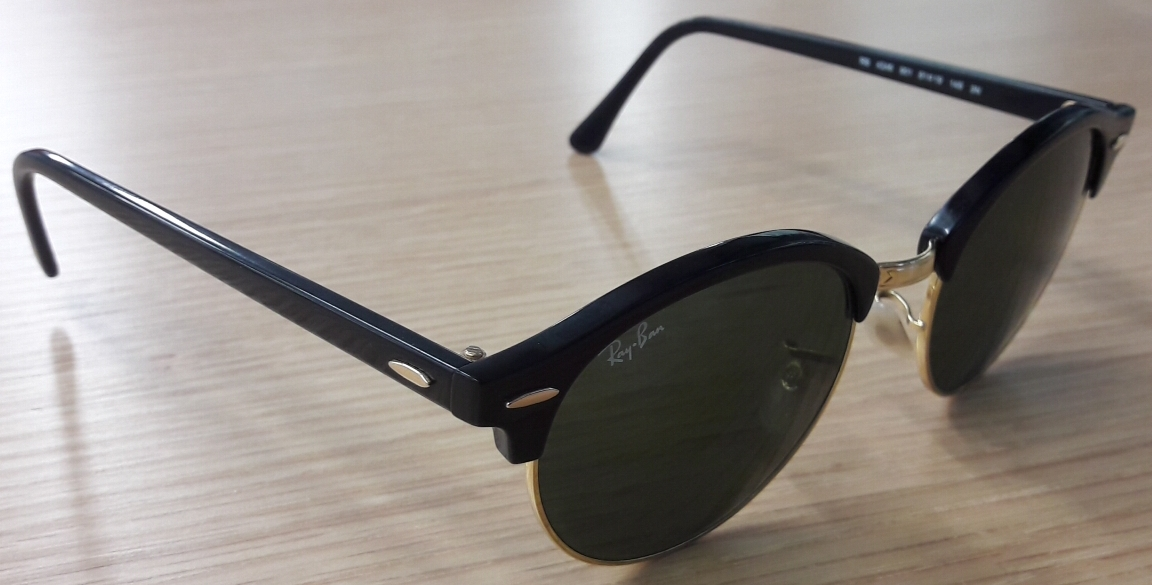
Ray-Ban 4246 Clubround sunglasses in colours of black and gold

== See also ==
- Gentle Monster
- Oliver Goldsmith
- Persol
- Warby Parker
