= Oliver Goldsmith (company) =

British eyewear design company

Oliver Goldsmith Sunglasses Ltd
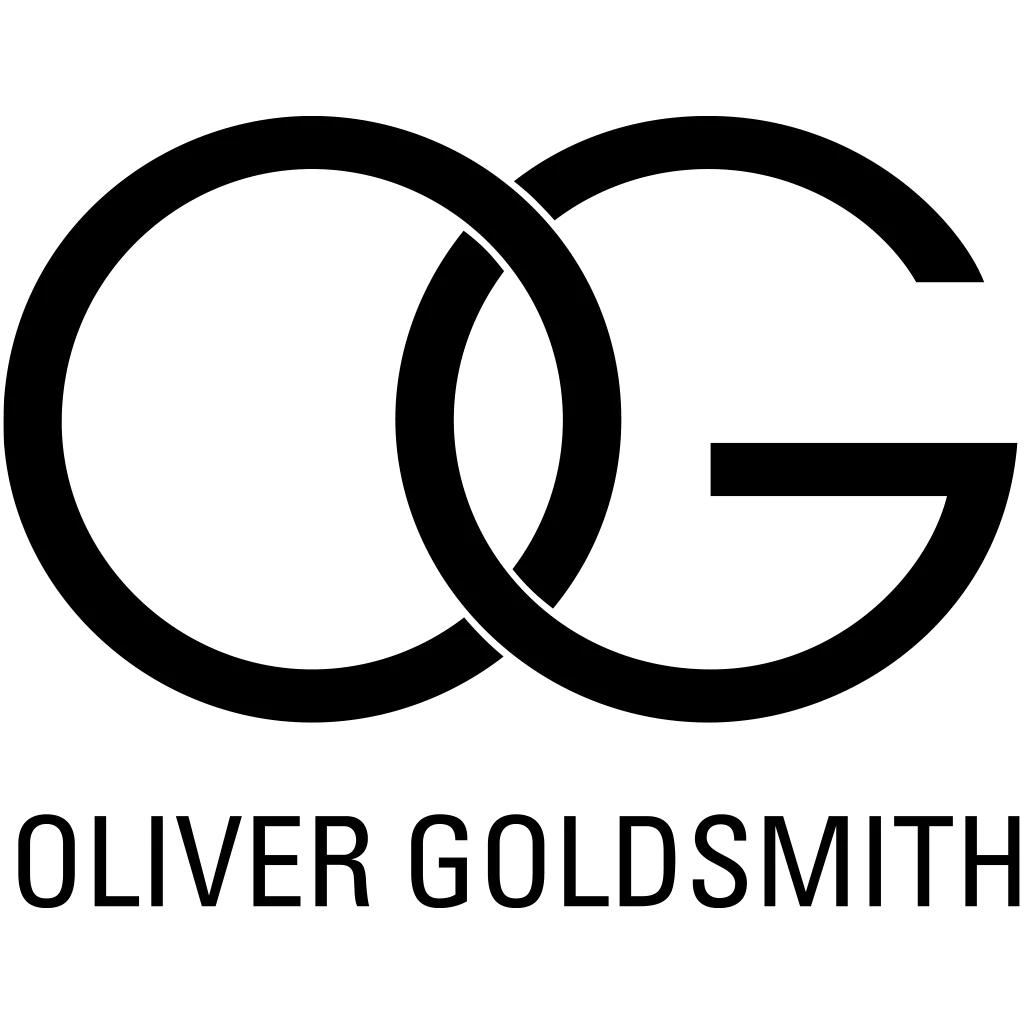
- Trade name: Oliver Goldsmith
- Industry: Eyewear
- Founded: 1926 in London, England
- Founder: Philip Oliver Goldsmith
- Headquarters: London, United Kingdom
- Area served: Global
- Key people: Claire Goldsmith
- Products: Sunglasses & Spectacles
- Website: olivergoldsmith.com

Oliver Goldsmith is a British eyewear design company established in London in 1926 by Phillip Oliver Goldsmith. Under the directorship of his son Charles "Oliver" Goldsmith and grandsons Andrew Oliver and Raymond the brand became known worldwide for its innovative designs. These included glasses and sunglasses famously worn by celebrities such as Diana Dors, Michael Caine and Audrey Hepburn. Notably, Hepburn's sunglasses in Breakfast at Tiffany's were an Oliver Goldsmith design. The spectacles have remained in production without interruption, whereas the production of sunglasses ceased in 1985 and was revived in 2005 after a 20-year hiatus by the founder's great-granddaughter, Claire Goldsmith.

== Company history ==
Philip Oliver Goldsmith (1890-1947) started out as a travelling salesman for Raphaels opticians, before opening an opticians at 60 Poland Street specialising in handmade spectacles-frames of real tortoiseshell. His son Charles (1914-1991) joined him in 1930, and during the Second World War, the firm supplied spectacles to the armed forces whilst catering to civilians.

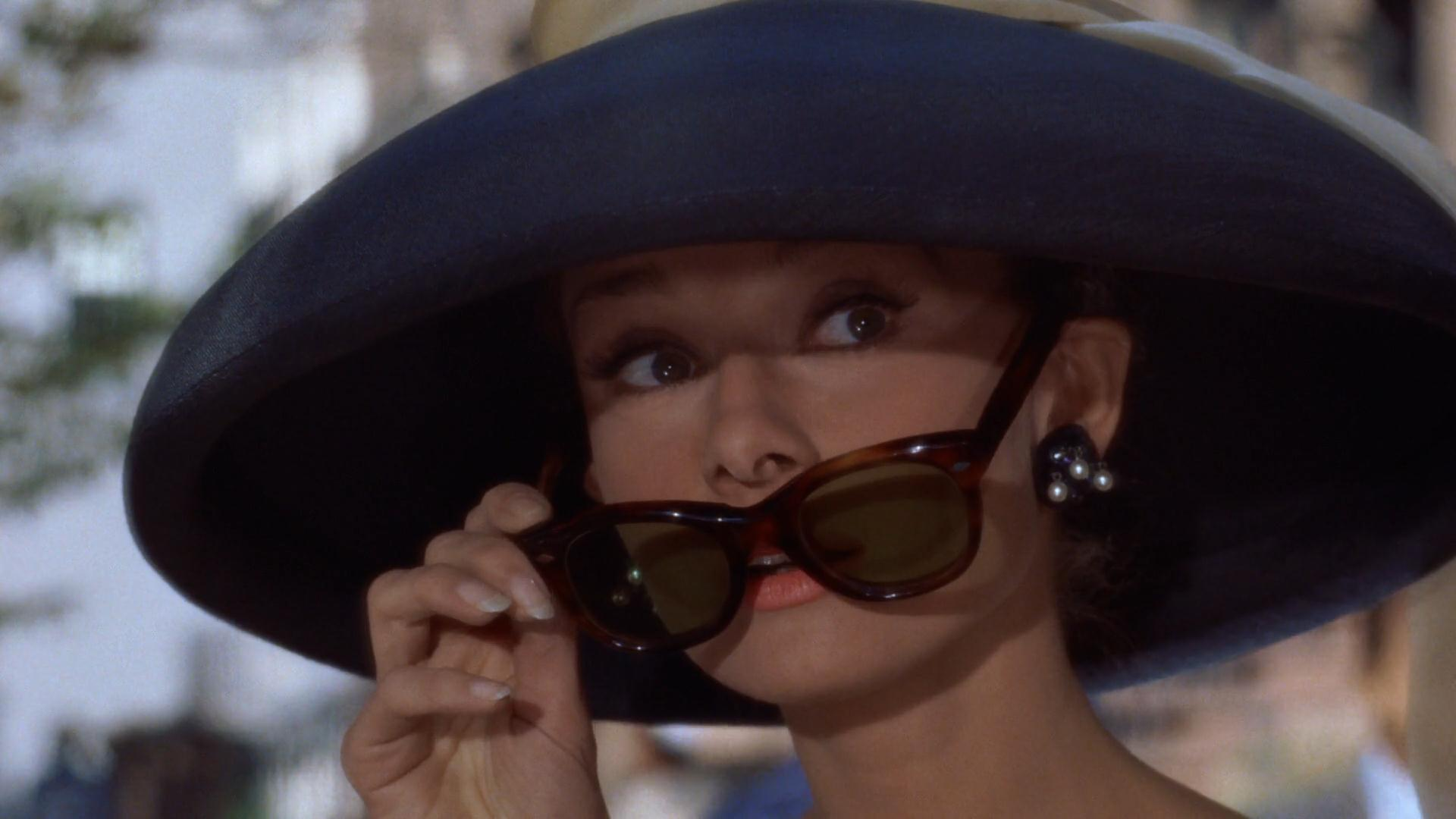
Audrey Hepburn in Breakfast at Tiffany's wearing a pair of Oliver Goldsmith 'Manhattan' sunglasses, 1961

In 1947, following Philip's death, Charles took his company's name as his own, and became chairman. As Oliver Goldsmith, he used press coverage and celebrity endorsements to publicise the company and their creative designs. Their eyewear was worn by Lord Snowdon, Diana Dors, and Diana, Princess of Wales, and often featured unexpected novelty designs such as music notes or large hand-painted acetate butterflies perched on the wearer's nose. Goldsmith's creative frames helped establish the idea of spectacles and eyewear as a fun fashion accessory, rather than simply a functional necessity. Audrey Hepburn notably wore the brand's 'Manhattan' sunglasses in Breakfast at Tiffany's, although at the time they were mistaken for Ray-Ban Wayfarers. The Goldsmiths also collaborated with Paris couture houses including Dior and Givenchy.

Oliver's sons A. Oliver (Andrew Oliver, b.1942) and Raymond (1944-1997) also joined the firm, with A. Oliver joining in 1959 on a general apprenticeship before becoming the glasses frame designer in 1965, and eventually manager by the 21st-century, whilst Raymond became manager of the sunglasses line.

In 1985, the company ceased producing sunglasses, although clients were still able to get their sunglasses repaired by skilled craftsmen working in the factory in Clacton. The optical side of the business continued to produce spectacles under the management of A. Oliver.

In 2006, Raymond's daughter, Claire Goldsmith, who had inherited the rights following his death in 1997, relaunched the sunglasses line. The company's success post-relaunch was fuelled by demand for vintage reissues of the original 1950s, 1960s and 1970s designs made in the same way as the originals. The company has a large archive collection of frames from which they choose the models for reissue.

== Legacy ==
The Victoria and Albert Museum holds a substantial group of eyewear produced by the firm between 1930 and 1985, recording the development of eyewear from 1920s tortoiseshell frames to mid-century plastics to 1980s fashion eyewear.

A retrospective of Oliver Goldsmith eyewear was held in 2014 at the National Glass Centre in Sunderland.

== See also ==
- Persol
- Warby Parker
- Ray-Ban
- Gentle Monster
- Blue Elephant
