= Haus Nowhere =

Series of multi-brand retail and exhibition spaces

Haus Nowhere is a series of multi-brand retail and exhibition spaces created by IICOMBINED, the parent company of South Korean eyewear brand Gentle Monster. The locations house IICOMBINED brands and are also used for exhibitions, installations, and food and beverage venues. By December 2025, five locations had opened: two in Seoul and one each in Shanghai, Shenzhen, and Bangkok.

== History ==
The first location, Haus Dosan, opened in Seoul on February 24, 2021. The location is now known as Haus Nowhere Dosan.

A second location opened in Shanghai in September 2021 after an existing Gentle Monster flagship on Huaihai Road was expanded and remodelled. By March 2024, the site had been renovated and renamed Haus Nowhere Shanghai.

Haus Nowhere Shenzhen opened on September 5, 2024, as the third location. Haus Nowhere Seoul opened in Seongsu-dong in September 2025 and became the fourth project in the series. The Bangkok location followed in December 2025 as the fifth site.

== Locations ==
=== Haus Nowhere Dosan ===
Haus Nowhere Dosan occupies a five-storey concrete building near Dosan Park. Designed by BCHO Architects, the building previously housed the Queenmama Market concept store.

Nudake is located in the basement, while Gentle Monster and Tamburins occupy the upper floors. The first floor has been used for changing exhibitions. Works shown when the location opened included an installation by Belgian artist Frederik Heyman, videos by German filmmaker Jonas Lindstroem, and The Probe, a six-legged robot displayed on the third floor.

=== Haus Nowhere Shanghai ===
Haus Nowhere Shanghai opened in 2021 under the name Haus Shanghai. The original four-floor layout included Nudake on the ground floor, Gentle Monster on the second floor, an exhibition area on the third, and Tamburins on the fourth.

The location was renovated and reopened under the name Haus Nowhere Shanghai by March 2024. Installations introduced at the time included a Gentle Monster and Maison Margiela collaboration and a Nudake display based on a fictional gym containing croissant-shaped equipment. The upper floor continued to be used for exhibitions.

=== Haus Nowhere Shenzhen ===
Haus Nowhere Shenzhen is located at MixC World in Shenzhen. It covers 6,914 square metres across three floors.

At the time of its opening, the installation programme was titled “Insect Kingdom” and was based on a fictional history involving humans, animals, and insects. The installations included the reclining Colossal First Human and a mural created by two artists from the Amsterdam-based team Freeling Waters.

=== Haus Nowhere Seoul ===
Haus Nowhere Seoul is located in Seongsu-dong and also contains IICOMBINED's headquarters. The building has 14 above-ground floors and was designed by The System Lab, led by architect Kim Chan-joong.

The public areas are located on the first, second, third, and fifth floors. The first floor is used for rotating launches and installations. Gentle Monster occupies the second floor, where the Painted Giants installation was displayed when the building opened. Tamburins, ATiiSSU, and Nuflaat are on the third floor, while the fifth floor contains the Nudake Tea House.

=== Haus Nowhere Bangkok ===
Haus Nowhere Bangkok opened at Iconsiam in December 2025. The location contains the first Tamburins store in Southeast Asia and a Gentle Monster store. Its opening display included the Sunshine Giant Dog installation, which had previously been shown at Haus Nowhere Seoul.
