= Personal Information Protection Commission =

Personal Information Protection Commission may refer to:

- Personal Information Protection Commission (Japan)
- Personal Information Protection Commission (South Korea)
