= Oblong (company) =

Cloud-based communication service provider

Oblong Inc.
- Formerly: Glowpoint, Inc.
- Company type: Public
- Traded as: Nasdaq: OBLG
- Industry: Diversified Communication Service
- Founded: 1991
- Headquarters: Denver, CO
- Key people: CEO, Mr. Peter J. Holst
- Website: glowpoint.com

Oblong Inc. (formerly Glowpoint, Inc.) is a cloud-based communication service provider. The company was founded in 1991 and its headquarter is in Denver, Colorado. It serves an enterprise customer base including about 600 customers, such as some Fortune 100 companies, governments and other profit and non-profit organizations. The company applies its core business platform, cloud-based OpenVideo platform, to deliver diverse services to customers. In 2011, its product, Virtual Visual Room, received 2011 NGN Leadership Award from NGN Magazine.

== Background ==
The portfolio of the company’s products consists of OpenVideo, TeamCamHD & RemoteCamHD and Network service. OpenVideo is a platform built under safety protocols to support the communication of Integrated Services Digital Network (ISDN). The company cooperates with Tier 1 MPLS (Multi-Protocol Label Switching) providers, including Global Crossing, Masergy, Qwest, TATA, PCCW and Verizon Business to delivers its cloud-based platform services. Its competitor base includes Global Telecom & Technology, Inc., West Corp., EarthLink Inc., Hawaiian Telcom Holdco Inc., etc.

On December 21, 2013, the company issued a press release stating that they were facilitating a video call event between singer Caroline Pennell from “The Voice” and children at St. Joseph’s Hospital.

In March 2020, the company changed its name to Oblong Inc. following a merger with Oblong Industries.
