= Kaenon Polarized =

Kaenon
- Company type: Private
- Industry: Eyewear
- Founded: 2001
- Founders: Steve Rosenberg and Darren Rosenberg
- Headquarters: Irvine, California, United States
- Products: Sunglasses, polarized eyewear, prescription eyewear
- Website: kaenon.com

Kaenon is a luxury performance eyewear brand based in Irvine, California, United States. The company was founded in 2001 by brothers Steve and Darren Rosenberg.

The company designs and manufactures polarized sunglasses and prescription eyewear. Kaenon is known for its proprietary SR-91 polarized lens material and performance-oriented eyewear products
