= Looxcie =

Video camera, webcam

Looxcie was a mobile-connected, handsfree, streaming video camera created by Looxcie, Inc., a privately owned Sunnyvale, California company. The Looxcie video camera was named a top 50 best invention of 2010 by Time Magazine (November 2010), and LooxcieLive, their live-streaming video service, was named as a top 100 best innovation of 2011 by Popular Science (December 2011).

== History ==
- September 2008 – the company is formed and venture financed

.

- September 2010 – the company sells its first camcorder Looxcie 1, and releases its first mobile app LooxcieMoments.
- December 2010 – the company releases its LooxcieCam mobile app.
- June 2011 – the company launches its second generation camcorder, Looxcie 2.
- October 2011 – the company introduces hands-free accessories for Looxcie 2.
- November 2011 – the company releases LooxcieLive live video streaming service.
- February 2012 – the company announces joint-development partnership with Taser International, Inc., who releases the AXON Flex product line. The AXON Flex features Looxcie technology.
- January 2014 – Company announces shift of focus from consumer to enterprise products (Vidcie)
- April 2014 – Company announces it will "Close down the consumer line of cameras, services, and support for the current Looxcie customers and partners."

== Mobile-connected streaming video cameras ==
Looxcie is a mobile-connected, handsfree, streaming video camera that facilitates live video streaming and capture. The live video streaming is designed for real-time sharing. Video clips can be saved on the camera and shared via a mobile device or uploaded to a computer.

Looxcie video cameras are compatible with Android (2.1+) and iOS (4.2.6+) devices. Looxcie utilizes a dual processor system for simultaneous video capture, Wireless streaming and phone calls via Bluetooth. The Looxcie maximizes battery life (up to 4 hours) and optimizes video for viewing (480p) and mobile sharing (320p) in a small wearable, ergonomic form factor.

=== Looxcie 2 ===
Looxcie 2 features an adjustable fit system with attachment accessories. Looxcie 2 weighs 22g (0.78 oz) and comes in two configurations: up to 5 hour video storage model and up to 10-hour video storage model.

=== Looxcie 1 ===
Looxcie 1 weighs less than 28g (0.99 oz) and provides up to 5-hour video storage.

== Accessories for Looxcie 2 ==
- For sports and outdoors: helmet strap mount, vented helmet mount, ball cap clip, bike mount
- For the car: windshield mount, car visor mount
- Lenses: 180° fisheye Lens, 2X zoom telephoto lens, wide angle and macro lens
- Essentials: carrying case, wall charger, tripod, tripod head

== Mobile apps ==
Looxcie companion apps are available for download from LooxcieDesktop, the App Store and Play Store (Android Market).

=== LooxcieLive ===
LooxcieLive lets users stream live video and view other people’s broadcasts in real-time. Push-to-Talk and Text Chat features allow viewers to dialog with the broadcaster while they live stream. Video streaming auto-adapts based on network capabilities – 3G, 4G or Wi-Fi.

=== LooxcieMoments ===
LooxcieMoments allows users to continuously record video into a looping buffer. With the Instant Clip button on Looxcie, users can reach back and save the last 30-seconds of an event, which can then be shared to social networks and email.

=== LooxcieCam ===
LooxcieCam provides users with basic camcorder functionality.

== See also ==
- EyeTap
- GoPro
- Google Glass
- Glasshole
- SixthSense
- Sousveillance
- Vuzix
