= Steve Mann (inventor) =

Canadian wearable tech engineer (born 1962)

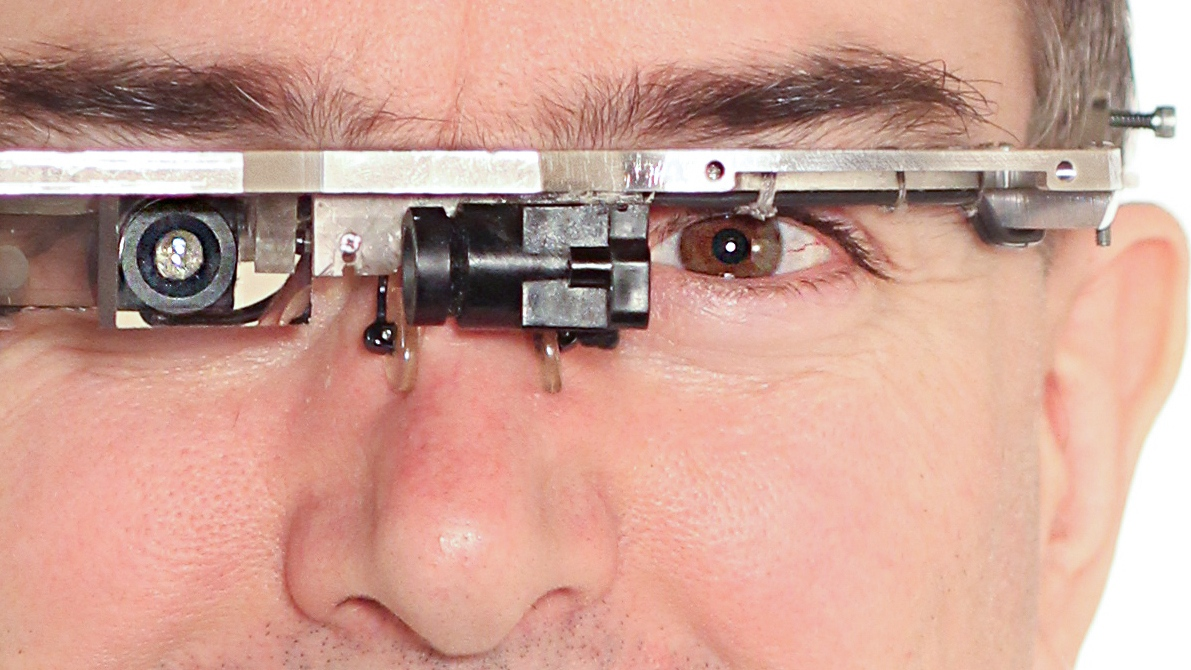
- Steve Mann with Generation-4 EyeTap
- Born: William Stephen George Mann; 8 June 1962 (age 64); Hamilton, Ontario
- Citizenship: Canada
- Education: McMaster University (B.Sc., B.Eng., M.Eng.); Massachusetts Institute of Technology (PhD)
- Known for: Wearable computing; High-dynamic-range imaging; Chirplet transform; Hydraulophone; Natural user interface; Scratch input; Mobile blogging; Sousveillance; Augmented reality; Humanistic intelligence
- Awards: IEEE Fellow (2024); Lifeboat Foundation Guardian Award (2024); IEEE Masaru Ibuka Consumer Electronics Award (2025)
- Scientific career
- Fields: Computer engineering; Electrical engineering; Artificial intelligence
- Workplaces: University of Toronto
- Thesis: Personal imaging (1997)
- Doctoral advisor: Rosalind Picard
- Website: https://www.eecg.utoronto.ca/~mann/

William Stephen George Mann (born 8 June 1962) is a Canadian engineer, professor, and inventor who works in wearable computing, augmented reality, extended reality, and computational photography, particularly high-dynamic-range imaging. Mann is considered the "father of wearable computing" for his early inventions and continuing contributions to the field.

Mann is a founding member of the IEEE Council on Extended Intelligence (CXI). He cofounded Blueberry X Technologies and served as its CTO from 2019 to 2021, and is the Chairman of MannLab. He was born in Canada and currently lives in Toronto, Canada with his wife and two children. Mann unsuccessfully ran for mayor of Toronto in the 2023 mayoral by-election.

== Early life and education ==
Mann holds a PhD in Media Arts and Sciences (1997) from the Massachusetts Institute of Technology (MIT) and a B.Sc., B.Eng. and M.Eng. from McMaster University in 1987, 1989 and 1992, respectively.

While in high school, Mann built a wearable 6502-based computer in a steel-frame backpack to control photographic systems.

== Career ==
Mann is a tenured full professor at the Department of Electrical and Computer Engineering, with cross-appointments to the Faculty of Arts and Sciences and Faculty of Forestry at the University of Toronto, and is a Professional Engineer licensed through Professional Engineers Ontario.

=== Ideas and inventions ===
Mann with three of his inventions: EyeTap Digital Eye Glass, Smartwatch, and SWIM (Sequential Wave Imprinting Machine) phenomenological augmented reality.

Many of Mann's inventions pertain to the field of computational photography.

Chirplet transform
In 1991, Mann was the first to propose and reduce to practice a signal representation based on a family of chirp signals, each associated with a coefficient, in a generalization of the wavelet transform that is now referred to as the chirplet transform.
Eye Glass
"Digital Eye Glass," "Eye Glass," "Glass Eye," or "Glass" is a device that, when worn, causes the human eye itself to effectively become both an electronic camera and a television display. Mann developed this technology starting in 1978.
Comparametric equations
In 1993, Mann was the first to propose and implement an algorithm to estimate a camera's response function from a plurality of differently exposed images of the same subject matter. He was also the first to propose and implement an algorithm to automatically extend dynamic range in an image by combining multiple differently exposed pictures of the same subject matter.
High-dynamic-range imaging (HDR)
"The first report of digitally combining multiple pictures of the same scene to improve dynamic range appears to be Mann." (Robertson et al.) Mann's work on wearable computing was motivated by his early computer vision systems that helped people see better (e.g. while welding, or in other high-dynamic range situations, with dynamic range management, overlays, and augmentation as well as diminishment in both the additive and subtractive sense).
Hydraulophone
Mann invented an experimental musical instrument that uses pressurized hydraulic fluid, such as water, to make sound. The instrument is played by placing the fingers in direct contact with the sound-producing hydraulic fluid, thus giving the musician a high degree of control over the musical expression in the sound.
Integral kinematics and integral kinesiology
Mann developed principles of negative derivatives (integrals) of displacement, such as absement (the area under the displacement-time curve), as embodied by hydraulophones (water-based instruments). This work has been built upon by others, and forms the basis for a different way of understanding electrical engineering. See also Mann's 2014 paper, "Integral Kinematics (Time‐Integrals of Distance, Energy, etc.) and Integral Kinesiology."
Natural user interface
In the 1980s and '90s, Mann developed a number of user-interface strategies using natural interaction with the real world as an alternative to a command-line interface (CLI) or graphical user interface (GUI). Mann referred to this work as "Natural User Interfaces", "Direct User Interfaces", and "Metaphor-Free Computing".
Scratch input
Scratch input is an acoustic-based method of Human-Computer Interaction (HCI) that takes advantage of the characteristic sound produced when a finger nail, stick, or other object strikes or is dragged over a surface, such as a table or wall.
Sensory Singularity
Together with Marvin Minsky and Ray Kurzweil, Mann proposed the theory of the "Sensularity" (Sensory Singularity) and cyborg-logging.
Surveilluminescent wand
A surveilluminescent wand is a device for visualizing vision and seeing sight, by way of making visible the sightfield (time-reversed lightfield) of a camera or similar computer vision sensor, using time-exposure with array of surveilluminescent lights to make visible to one camera what another camera can see.
Telepointer and SixthSense
This is a wearable computer based on a pendant that contains a webcam and laser-based infinite depth-of-focus projector, and related technologies for gesture-based wearable computing systems.
Video Orbits
In 1993, Mann was the first to produce an algorithm for automatically combining multiple pictures of the same subject matter, using algebraic projective geometry, to "stitch together" images using automatically estimated perspective correction. This is called the "Video Orbits" algorithm.

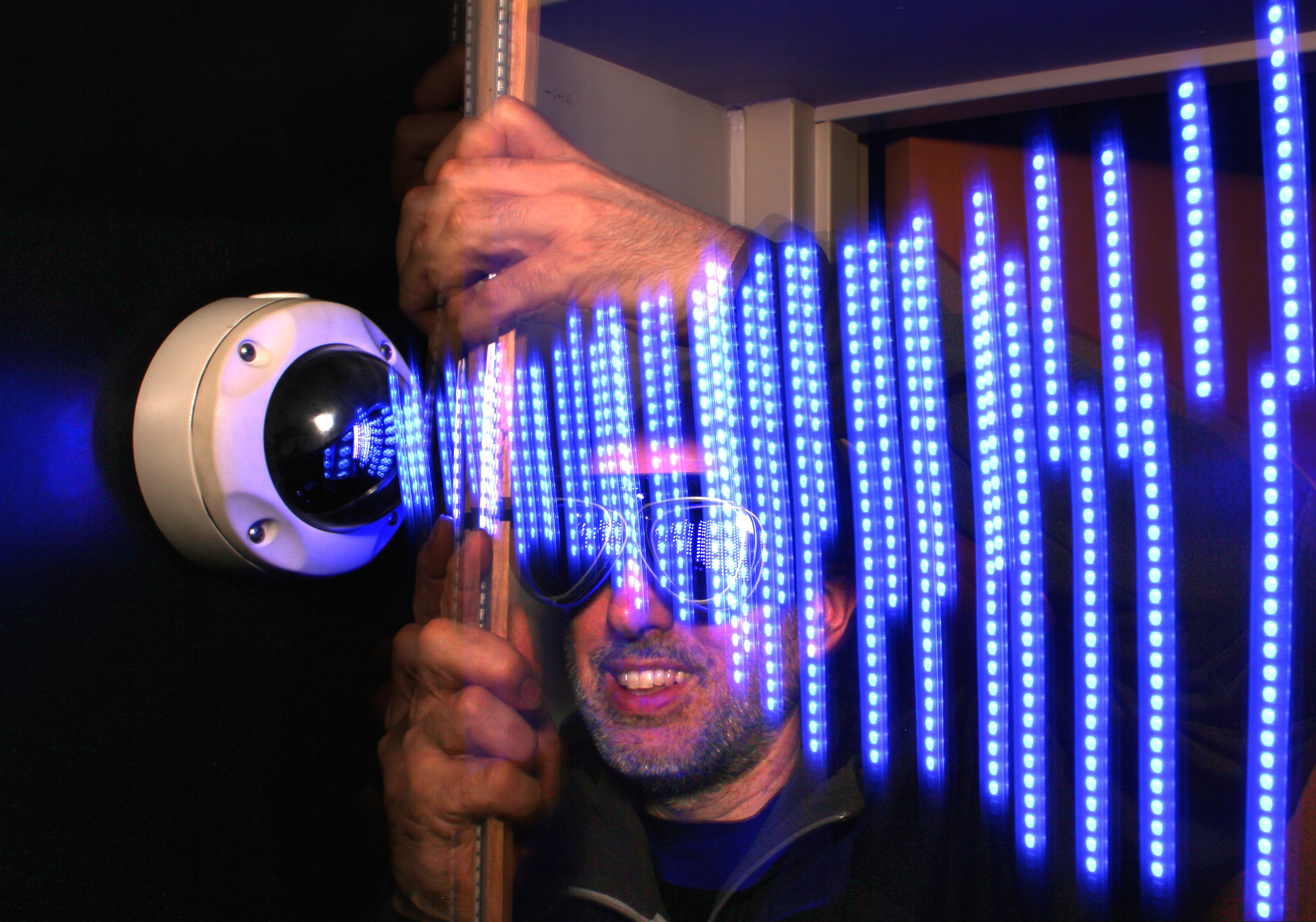
Surveilluminescent wand: When moved through space in a long-exposure photograph, it makes the sightfield of a surveillance camera visible.

Mann also works in the fields of computer-mediated reality. He is a strong advocate of privacy rights. His work also extends to the area of sousveillance (a term he coined for "inverse surveillance"). Mann and one of his PhD students, James Fung, together with some of his other students, have been building a cyborg community around the cyborg-logging concept.

- Mann, together with Professor Ian Kerr at the University of Ottawa, has written extensively on surveillance, sousveillance, and equiveillance. "Sousveillance," a term coined by Mann, along with the concepts that he and Kerr have developed around these ideas, have created a new dialog for cyborg technologies, as well as related personal information gathering technologies like camera phones. He has created the related concept of humanistic intelligence.
- In 2003, Joi Ito credited Mann with having initiated the moblogging movement by creating a system for transmission of realtime pictures, video, and text. In particular, from 1994 to 1996, Mann continuously transmitted his life's experiences, in real time, to his website for others to experience, interact with, and respond to.

His CyborGLOGS ('glogs), such as the spontaneous reporting of news as everyday experience, were an early predecessor of 'blogs and the concept of blogging, and earlier than that, his pre-internet-era live streaming of personal documentary and cyborg communities defined cyborg-logging as a new form of social networking.

=== Anonequity project ===
Mann is currently collaborating with a number of researchers including Ian Kerr, Canada Research Chair in Ethics, Law & Technology, University of Ottawa, who teaches a course on "Cyborg Law" that uses Mann's book. Mann, together with Kerr and others, are doing an SSHRC-funded project to study the Ethics, Law & Technology of anonymity, authentication, surveillance, and sousveillance, in addition to issues related to cyborg-law. The anonequity project is ongoing, and collaborator Kerr has also researched and lectured widely on implantable technologies.

== Awards and honours ==
Mann was inducted into the McMaster University Alumni Hall of Fame in 2004, in recognition of his career as an inventor and teacher.

While at MIT, in then Director Nicholas Negroponte's words, "Steve Mann … brought the seed" that founded the Wearable Computing group in the Media Lab and "Steve Mann is the perfect example of someone … who persisted in his vision and ended up founding a new discipline." In 2004 he was named the recipient of the 2004 Leonardo Award for Excellence for his article "Existential Technology," published in Leonardo 36:1.

He is also General Chair of the IEEE International Symposium on Technology and Society, Associate Editor of IEEE Technology and Society, is a licensed Professional Engineer, and Senior Member of the IEEE, as well as a member of the IEEE Council on Extended Intelligence (CXI).

Mann received the 2025 IEEE Masaru Ibuka Consumer Electronics Award for his work in wearable computing. He also received the 2024 Lifeboat Foundation Guardian Award for related work on sousveillance.

== Media coverage ==
Mann has been referred to as the "father of wearable computing", having created the first general-purpose wearable computer, in contrast to previous wearable devices that perform one specific function such as time-keeping (e.g. wristwatch); calculations (e.g. wearable abacus); or Edward O. Thorp and Claude Shannon's wearable computers, which were timing devices concealed in shoes or cigarette packs and designed for gaining an advantage at roulette.

Mann has also been described as "the world's first cyborg" in Canadian popular press such as NOW, The Globe and Mail, National Post, and Toronto Life, but has himself rejected the term "cyborg" as being too vague.

In 2023, Steve Mann ran for Mayor of Toronto. As part of his campaign he advocated for recreational swimming in Lake Ontario, and supported efforts to save the beach at Ontario Place.

== Publications ==
Mann is author of more than 200 publications, including a textbook on electric eyeglasses and a popular culture book on day-to-day cyborg living. Selected works:

- Intelligent Image Processing ISBN 0-471-40637-6
- Cyborg: Digital Destiny and Human Possibility in the Age of the Wearable Computer Randomhouse Doubleday 2001
- The Wireless Application Protocol (WAP): A Wiley Tech Brief ISBN 0-471-39992-2
- International Journal of Human-Computer Interaction 2003: Special Issue : Mediated Reality ISBN 0-8058-9604-X
- Advanced Palm Programming: Developing Real-World Applications ISBN 0-471-39087-9

== See also ==
- Gordon Bell
- Geoffrey Hinton
- Ray Kurzweil
- Marvin Minsky
- Kevin Warwick
- Surveillance art
- Chorded keyboard
