= Computer-mediated reality =

Ability to manipulate one's perception of reality through the use of a computer

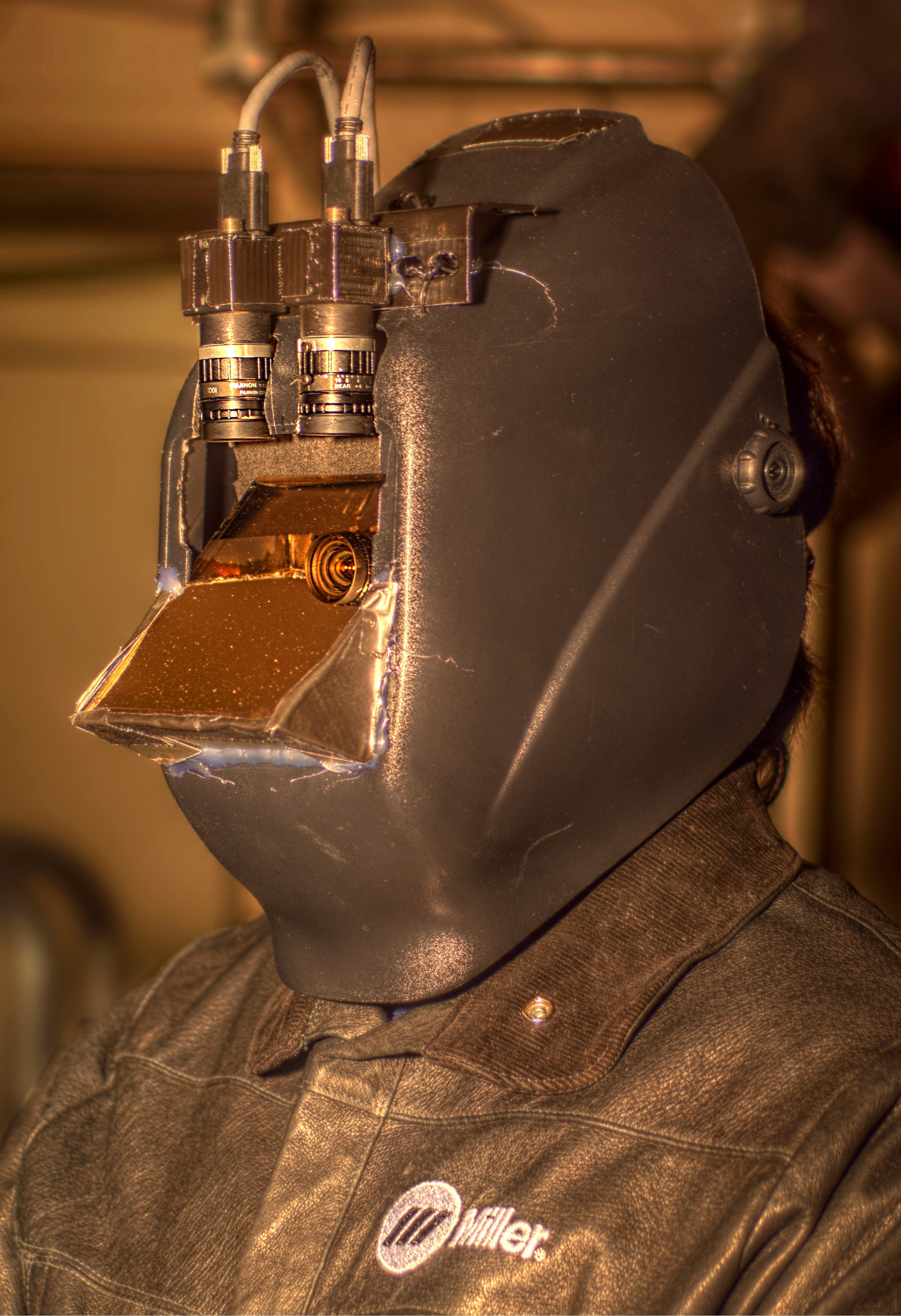
The MannGlas "Digital Eye Glass" welding helmet uses cameras and high-dynamic-range imaging to augment the user's view in dark areas and diminish it in bright areas.

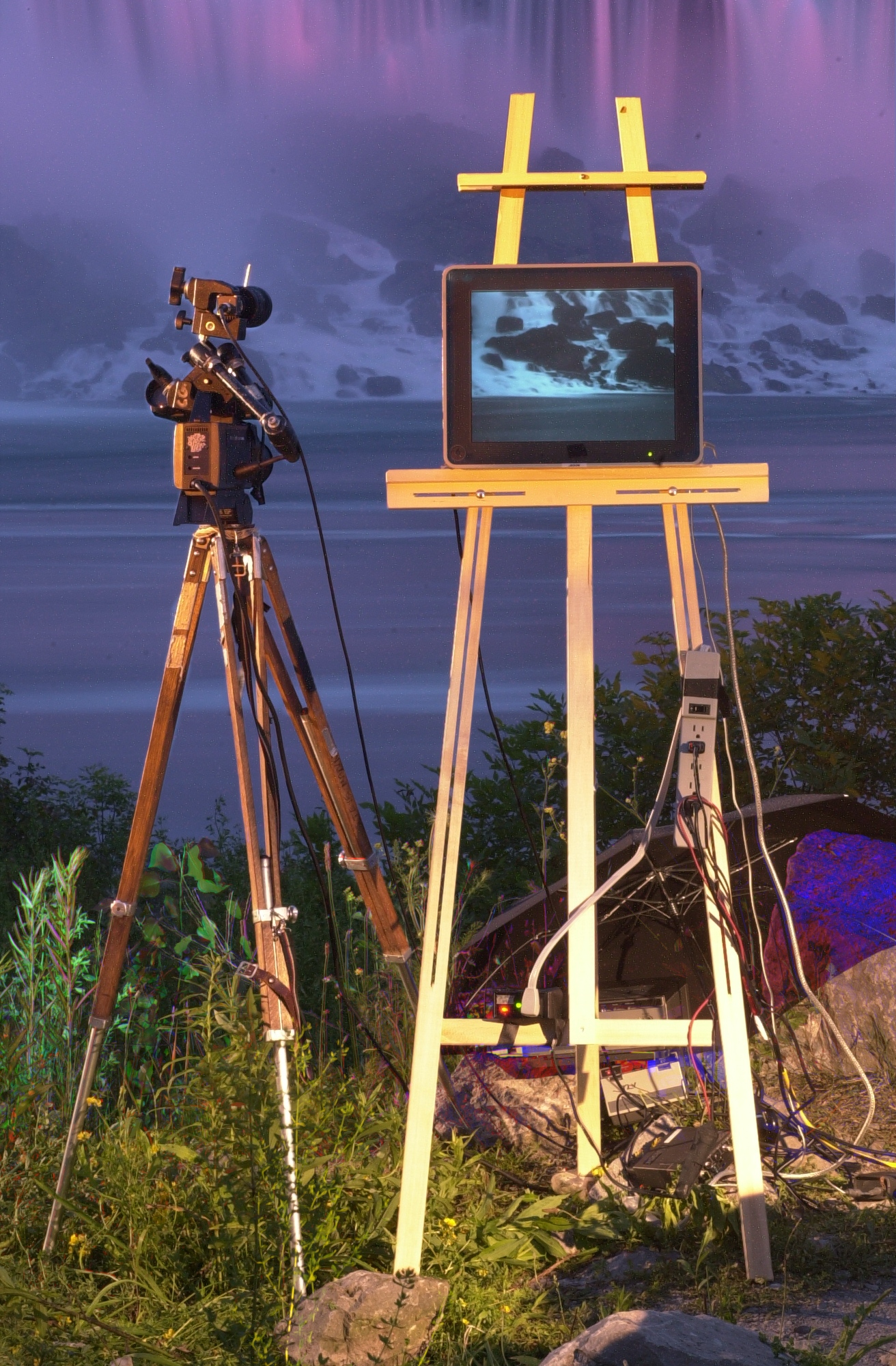
Art installation illustrating the mediated reality concept. First we display what's really there, and then this allows a computer to be inserted into the "reality stream" to modify it.

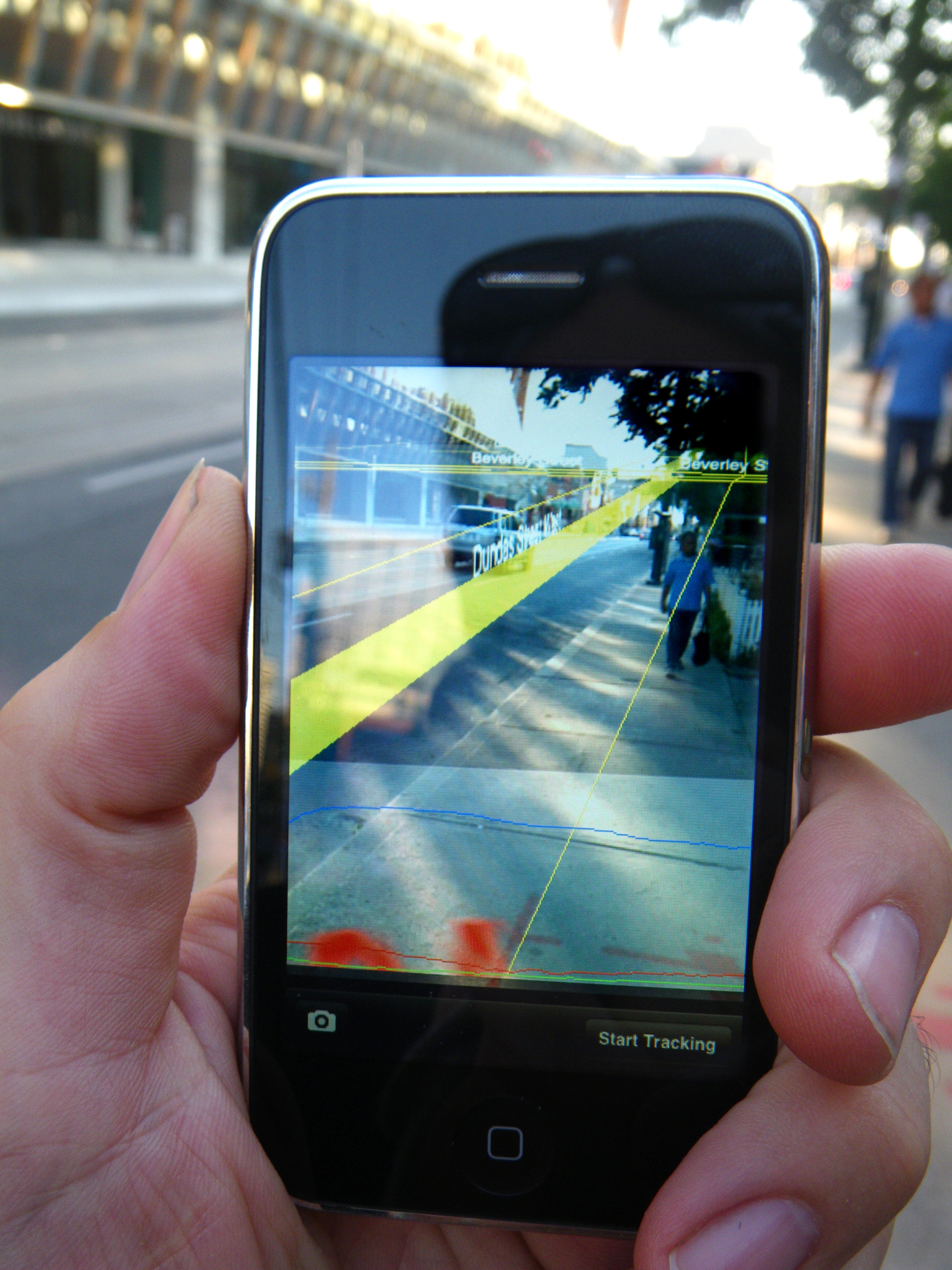
Augmented reality application running on an iPhone

Computer-mediated reality refers to the ability to add to, subtract information from, or otherwise manipulate one's perception of reality through the use of a wearable computer or hand-held device such as a smartphone.

Mediated reality is a proper superset of mixed reality, augmented reality, and virtual reality, as it also includes, for example, diminished reality.

Typically, it is the user's visual perception of the environment that is mediated. This is done through the use of some kind of electronic device, such as an EyeTap device or smart phone, which can act as a visual filter between the real world and what the user perceives. Computer-mediated reality has been used to enhance visual perception as an aid to the visually impaired. This example achieves a mediated reality by altering a video input stream light that would have normally reached the user's eyes, and computationally altering it to filter it into a more useful form. It has also been used for interactive computer interfaces.

The use of computer-mediated reality to diminish perception, by the removal or masking of visual data, has been used for architectural applications, and is an area of ongoing research.

The long-term effects of altering perceived reality have not been thoroughly studied, and negative side effects of long-term exposure might be possible. Short term effects have been demonstrated with the eyestrain caused by computers.

== As a seeing aid ==
In the 1970s and 1980s, Steve Mann introduced the Generation-1 and Generation-2 "Digital Eye Glass", initially as a vision aid to help people see better, as a welding helmet, and as a general-purpose seeing aid for everyday life as outlined in IEEE Technology & Society 31(3) and the supplemental material entitled "GlassEyes".

In this sense, mediated reality is a proper superset of mixed reality, augmented reality, and virtual reality, as it also includes, for example, diminished reality.

== Wireless mediated reality ==
With wireless communications, mediated reality can also become a communications medium among different communities. For example, Bluetooth devices are often used with mediated reality. With the use of EyeTap, such interaction is called "seeing eye-to-eye".

== Applications ==
Applications of mediated reality include devices that help people see better, as well as devices for gaming and equipment repair, telemedicine, remote expert advice interfaces, and wayfinding. Mediated reality is also used in robotics and drawing applications such as the "Loose and Sketchy" drawing package.

One key application of computer-mediated reality is healthcare and medicine, which has become a popular research area, specifically beginning in the 1990s with the field growing larger over time. Common research topics include applications of computer-mediated reality in surgery, diagnosing diseases generally, and aiding care of neurodegenerative diseases like Parkinson's. In surgery, studies have shown that the use of virtual reality simulations can be used to reduce error, improve efficiency, and be used generally as training. Other applications in surgery include modeling, which allows for more extensive planning of surgeries prior to the procedure that can also be more personalized to the patient, and image-guided surgery, in which machines and overlays would allow for more accuracy in the surgical processes. There have even been complete telesurgeries, where the surgeon operates on a 3D model of the patient while a robot executes the actions. This has been used for basic surgeries on swine and more advanced surgeries on swine and humans. With neurodegenerative diseases, virtual reality has been used to simulate situations that train memory but aren't reproduce in a standard treatment environment. Virtual reality may also be used for interfacing with a patient in their home, with data sent directly to the physician, or creating games that would encourage these exercises. Virtual reality has also been used to aid those with a fear of heights, anxiety, depression, and autism. It has also been used to reduce patients' pain.

A widely implemented development of computer-mediated reality in medicine is the invention of electronic consultation, such as services like Teladoc.

Within video games, the most common form of computer-mediated reality is virtual reality headsets, such as Oculus Rift. These are devices that attach to the user's head and immerse their field of vision solely within the game world. Controllers used for virtual reality games range from traditionally designed controllers to controllers designed to track the motions of the user. In addition to virtual reality, augmented reality has also been used for video games. The most prominent example is Pokémon Go, an augmented reality game for mobile devices where Pokémon creatures are displayed through the phone to appear as if they are part of the real world. Other examples of AR games include Harry Potter: Wizards Unite and Ingress, which was developed by the same developer behind Pokémon Go.

Augmented reality technology has similarly been applied with social media applications such as Snapchat. These lenses range from adding 3D digital objects to pictures to altering the appearance of those in the photos. One of the most common types are beauty filters, which digitally alter the user's appearance to make the user appear more "beautiful." Beauty filters have been correlated to lower self esteem.

== Related concepts ==
Mediated reality is related to other concepts such as augmented reality, virtual reality, mixed reality, etc.

== See also ==
- Extended reality
- Sensorial transposition – Remote reality technique
- Simulated reality – Concept of a false version of reality
- Synthetic vision system – Technological system to enhance pilot situational awareness in the cockpit
- Ubiquitous computing – Concept in software engineering and computer science
- Right to reality – Technology-related proposed right
