= Visuo-haptic mixed reality =

Branch of mixed reality

Visuo-haptic mixed reality (VHMR) is a branch of mixed reality that has the ability of merging visual and tactile perceptions of both virtual and real objects with a collocated approach. The first known system to overlay augmented haptic perceptions on direct views of the real world is the Virtual Fixtures system developed in 1992 at the US Air Force Research Laboratories. Like any emerging technology, the development of the VHMR systems is accompanied by challenges that, in this case, deal with the efforts to enhance the multi-modal human perception with the user-computer interface and interaction devices at the moment available. Visuo-haptic mixed reality (VHMR) consists of adding to a real scene the ability to see and touch virtual objects. It requires the use of see-through display technology for visually mixing real and virtual objects and haptic devices necessary to provide haptic stimuli to the user while interacting with the virtual objects. A VHMR setup allows the user to perceive visual and kinesthetic stimuli in a co-located manner, i.e., the user can see and touch virtual objects at the same spatial location. This setup overcomes the limits of the traditional one, i.e., display and haptic device, because the visuo-haptic co-location of the user's hand and a virtual tool improve the sensory integration of multimodal cues and makes the interaction more natural. But it also comes with technological challenges in order to improve the naturalness of the perceptual experience.

== See also ==
- Augmented reality
- Multimodal interaction
- Reality–virtuality continuum
- Simulated reality
