= Natural user interface =

Type of user interface

In computing, a natural user interface (NUI) or natural interface is a user interface that is effectively invisible, and remains invisible as the user continuously learns increasingly complex interactions. The word "natural" is used because most computer interfaces use artificial control devices whose operation has to be learned. Examples include voice assistants, such as Alexa and Siri, touch and multitouch interactions on today's mobile phones and tablets, but also touch interfaces invisibly integrated into the textiles of furniture.

An NUI relies on a user being able to quickly transition from novice to expert. While the interface requires learning, that learning is eased through design which gives the user the feeling that they are instantly and continuously successful. Thus, "natural" refers to a goal in the user experience – that the interaction comes naturally, while interacting with the technology, rather than that the interface itself is natural. This is contrasted with the idea of an intuitive interface, referring to one that can be used without previous learning.

Several design strategies have been proposed which have met this goal to varying degrees of success. One strategy is the use of a "reality user interface" ("RUI"), also known as "reality-based interfaces" (RBI) methods. One example of an RUI strategy is to use a wearable computer to render real-world objects "clickable", i.e. so that the wearer can click on any everyday object so as to make it function as a hyperlink, thus merging cyberspace and the real world. Because the term "natural" is evocative of the "natural world", RBI are often confused for NUI, when in fact they are merely one means of achieving it.

One example of a strategy for designing a NUI not based in RBI is the strict limiting of functionality and customization, so that users have very little to learn in the operation of a device. Provided that the default capabilities match the user's goals, the interface is effortless to use. This is an overarching design strategy in Apple's iOS. Because this design is coincident with a direct-touch display, non-designers commonly misattribute the effortlessness of interacting with the device to that multi-touch display, and not to the design of the software where it actually resides.

== History ==
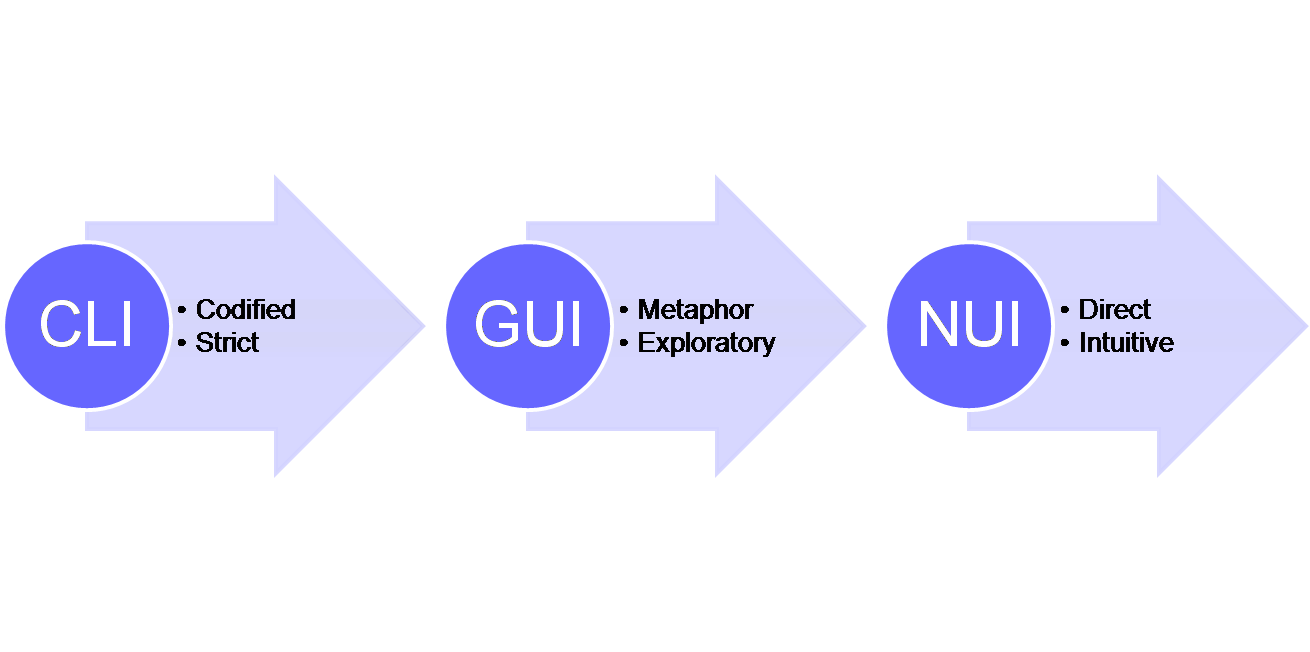
Evolution of user interfaces

In the 1990s, Steve Mann developed a number of user-interface strategies using natural interaction with the real world as an alternative to a command-line interface (CLI) or graphical user interface (GUI). Mann referred to this work as "natural user interfaces", "Direct User Interfaces", and "metaphor-free computing". Mann's EyeTap technology typically embodies an example of a natural user interface. Mann's use of the word "Natural" refers to both action that comes naturally to human users, as well as the use of nature itself, i.e. physics (Natural Philosophy), and the natural environment. A good example of an NUI in both these senses is the hydraulophone, especially when it is used as an input device, in which touching a natural element (water) becomes a way of inputting data. More generally, a class of musical instruments called "physiphones", so-named from the Greek words "physika", "physikos" (nature) and "phone" (sound) have also been proposed as "Nature-based user interfaces".

In 2006, Christian Moore established an open research community with the goal to expand discussion and development related to NUI technologies. In a 2008 conference presentation "Predicting the Past," August de los Reyes, a Principal User Experience Director of Surface Computing at Microsoft described the NUI as the next evolutionary phase following the shift from the CLI to the GUI. Of course, this too is an over-simplification, since NUIs necessarily include visual elements – and thus, graphical user interfaces. A more accurate description of this concept would be to describe it as a transition from WIMP to NUI.

In the CLI, users had to learn an artificial means of input, the keyboard, and a series of codified inputs, that had a limited range of responses, where the syntax of those commands was strict.

Then, when the mouse enabled the GUI, users could more easily learn the mouse movements and actions, and were able to explore the interface much more. The GUI relied on metaphors for interacting with on-screen content or objects. The 'desktop' and 'drag' for example, being metaphors for a visual interface that ultimately was translated back into the strict codified language of the computer.

An example of the misunderstanding of the term NUI was demonstrated at the Consumer Electronics Show in 2010. "Now a new wave of products is poised to bring natural user interfaces, as these methods of controlling electronics devices are called, to an even broader audience."

In 2010, Microsoft's Bill Buxton reiterated the importance of the NUI within Microsoft Corporation with a video discussing technologies which could be used in creating a NUI, and its future potential.

In 2010, Daniel Wigdor and Dennis Wixon provided an operationalization of building natural user interfaces in their book. In it, they carefully distinguish between natural user interfaces, the technologies used to achieve them, and reality-based UI.

== Types of interface ==
=== Multi-touch ===
When Bill Buxton was asked about the iPhone's interface, he responded "Multi-touch technologies have a long history. To put it in perspective, the original work undertaken by my team was done in 1984, the same year that the first Macintosh computer was released, and we were not the first."

Multi-Touch is a technology which could enable a natural user interface. Applications of animation creation with multi-touch systems have been demonstrated. However, most UI toolkits used to construct interfaces executed with such technology are traditional GUIs.

=== Gesture control ===
Hand gesture presents a natural way of interacting with computer systems, especially for those that involve 3D information such as manipulating virtual reality or augmented reality objects, thanks to the 3 dimensional movements of hand gestures. Such hand gestures can be extracted from images collected in color or RGB-D cameras, or captured from sensor gloves. Since hand gestures from such input sources are usually noisy, solutions based on artificial intelligence are presented to remove the sensor noisy, allowing more effective controls. Moreover, to tackle the computational delay in real-time applications, short-term prediction of hand gestures has enabled an improved level of interactivity.

== NUI software and hardware platforms ==
=== Surface computing ===
In 2006 Jefferson Han of Perceptive Pixel demonstrated a multi-touch interface capable of a variety of ways for interacting with on-screen content using both direct manipulations and gestures. For example, to shape an on-screen glutinous mass, one can use pinching, prodding and poking motions. In a traditional GUI interface, this would usually be done using a specialized tool, or by selecting control points on the mass to be shaped. Of course, this paradigm allows only for a limited set of interactions which map neatly onto physical manipulation (a reality-based interface, or RBI). Extending the capabilities of the software beyond physical actions requires significantly more design work. In 2012, Perceptive Pixel became a division within Microsoft.

Microsoft PixelSense (originally Microsoft Surface), is based on a similar paradigm, with the added ability to recognize objects that are placed on top of the device, which then become control points for the device. For example, if a wine glass is placed on the surface of the device, it is recognized as such and the display changes to show content associated with the glass.

=== 3D Immersive Touch ===
"3D Immersive Touch" is defined as the direct manipulation of 3D virtual environment objects using single or multi-touch surface hardware in multi-user 3D virtual environments. Coined first in 2007 to describe and define the 3D natural user interface learning principles associated with Edusim. Immersive Touch natural user interface now appears to be taking on a broader focus and meaning with the broader adaption of surface and touch driven hardware such as the iPhone, iPod touch, iPad, and a growing list of other hardware. Apple also seems to be taking a keen interest in "Immersive Touch" 3D natural user interfaces over the past few years. This work builds atop the broad academic base which has studied 3D manipulation in virtual reality environments.

=== Xbox Kinect ===
Kinect is a motion sensing input device by Microsoft for the Xbox 360 video game console and Windows PCs that uses spatial gestures for interaction instead of a game controller. According to Microsoft's page, Kinect is designed for "a revolutionary new way to play: no controller required.". Again, because Kinect allows the sensing of the physical world, it shows potential for RBI designs, and thus potentially also for NUI.

== See also ==
- Edusim
- Eye tracking
- Kinetic user interface
- Organic user interface
- Virtual assistant
- Post-WIMP
- Scratch input
- Spatial navigation
- Tangible user interface
- Touch user interface
