= Telepointer =

Gesture-based wearable computer system

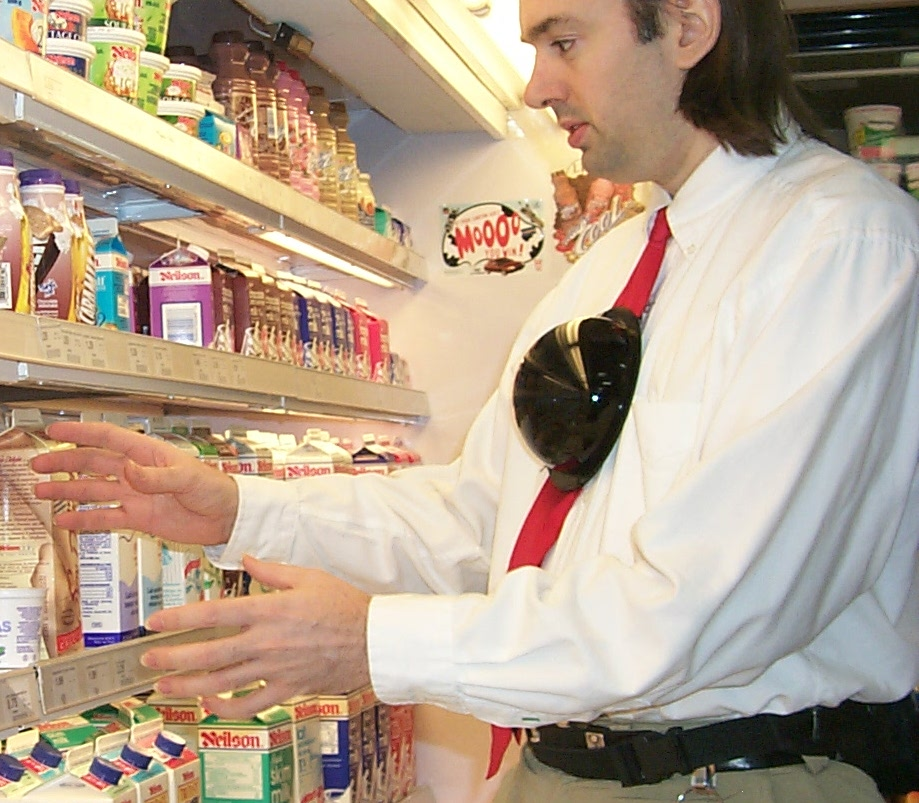
Mann wearing the Telepointer

Telepointer is a neck-worn gestural interface system developed by MIT Media Lab student Steve Mann in 1998. Mann originally referred to the device as "Synthetic Synesthesia of the Sixth Sense". In the 1990s and early 2000s, Mann used this project as a teaching example at the University of Toronto.

== Aremac projector ==
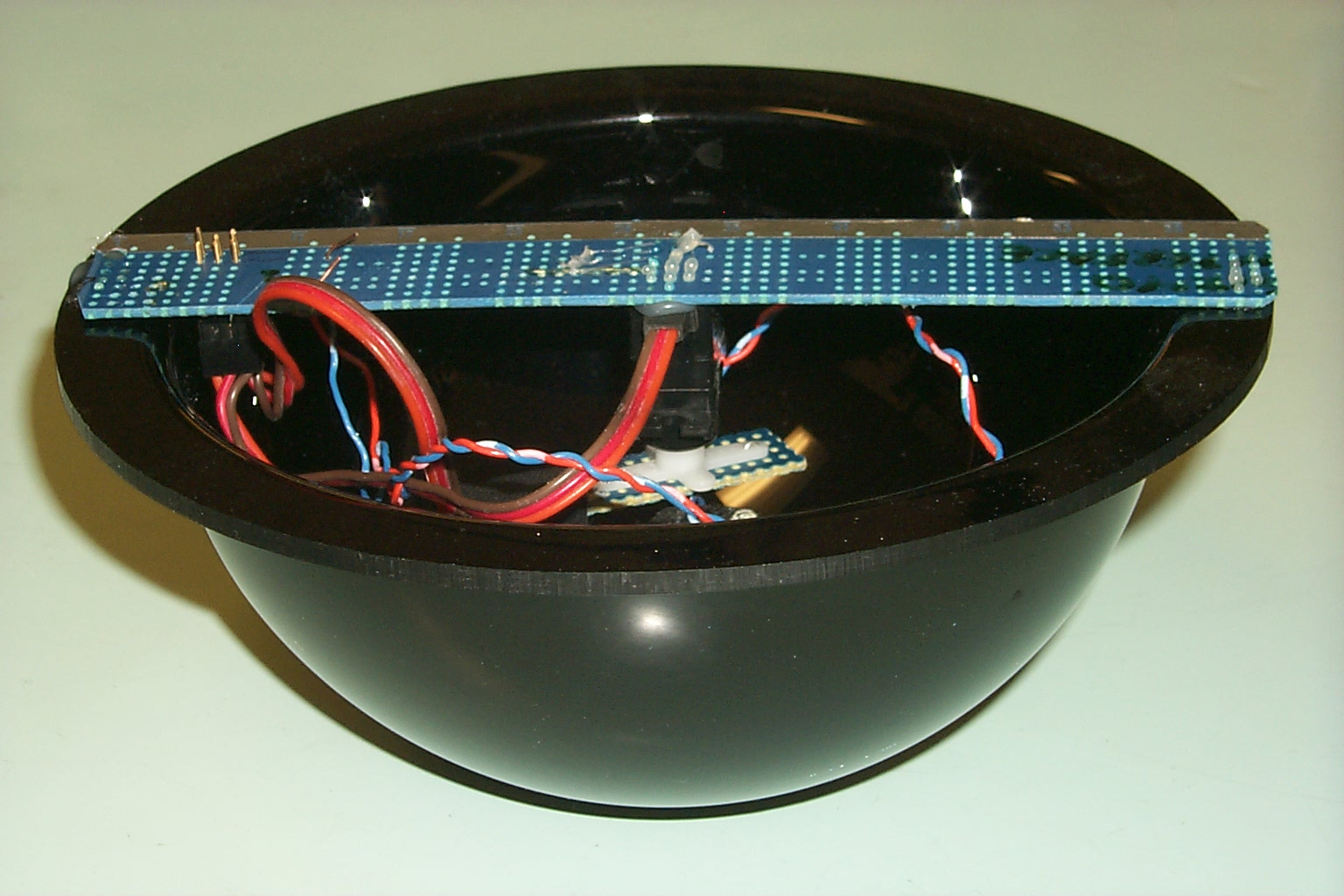
Closeup of dome pendant showing the "aremac" projector

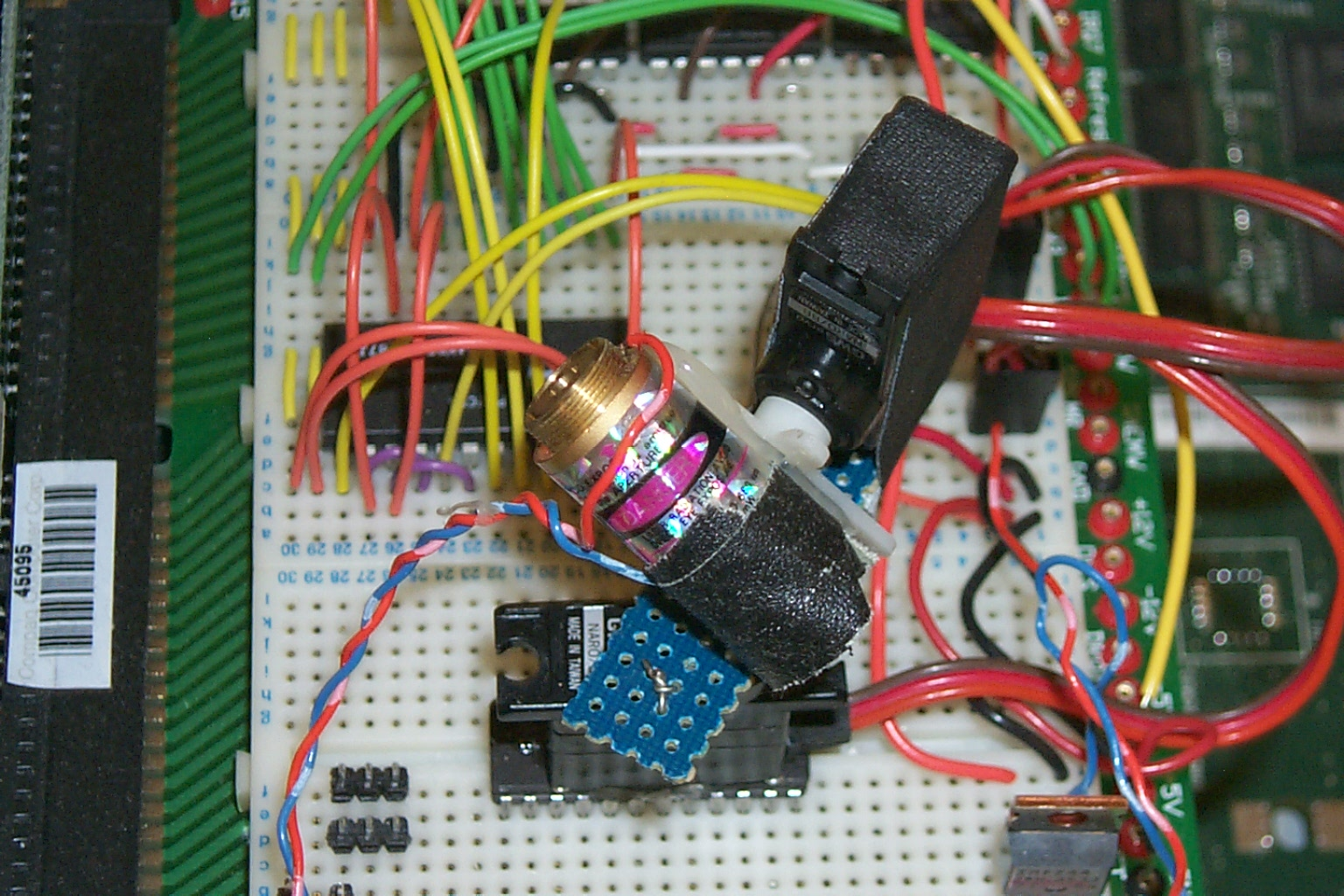
Early breadboard prototype of the aremac

Mann developed a laser-based infinite depth-of-focus projector, called an "aremac", to project onto any 3D surface without focus adjustment The projector originally displayed vector graphics rather than raster graphics. A raster graphics version based on a miniature wearable micromirror projector was developed in 2001, which could project onto the wearer's hands, other objects, or the floor or ground, allowing it to work with both hand or foot gestures.

== See also ==
- SixthSense, a similar, later, device
