= Science Expo =

Canadian national student run non-profit organization

- Founded: 2010
- Dissolved: 2017
- Type: Nonprofit organization
- Purpose: To promote STEM among Canadian advanced students.
- Origins: Guelph, Ontario
- Region served: Ontario, British Columbia, Alberta
- Key people: Maya Burhanpurkar, Jeremy Ho, Kaitlyn Yong, Abeera Shahid, Emma Lu, Amit Scheer
- Volunteers: 11-50
- Website: science-expo.org

Science Expo was a Canadian national student run non-profit organization that connected high-achieving youth to innovators and STEM (Science, Technology, Engineering and Mathematics) opportunities. In 2017, they merged with another Canadian non-profit, the Foundation for Student Science and Technology (FSST) which ran a similar platform, RISE (Research in Science and Engineering).

Science Expo was active from Vancouver to Toronto, with a network of 150 leaders reaching 80 high schools, representing a student body of over 120,000. They are best known for their annual conference, which has attracted thousands of high school students across Ontario to convene and connect with fellow like-minded students as well as leading innovators and scientists.

== History ==
Five individuals who met at the 2009 Canada Wide Science Fair and wanted to encourage more students to get involved in STEM opportunities founded Science Expo in 2010. Two months later, the first Science Expo, a 2-hour symposium, was held in a Guelph, Ontario high school auditorium. It attracted over 200 students, parents, and teachers, and featured Ph.D candidate and science fair guru Mubdi Rahman as the keynote speaker.

The next year, the Science Expo team held its first full day conference at the University of Waterloo, and marked a milestone by successfully registering as a non-for-profit organization. In addition, a group of 5 interns joined the team that summer, 4 of whom stayed on as executives in the following year. Science Expo experienced a rapid surge in growth in 2012, expanding both its team size to a group of 13 high school and university students, and its reach to include the Greater Toronto Area. Science Expo 2012 was held at the Ontario Science Centre, and featured Nobel Prize winner Dr. Brad Bass as one of its keynote speakers.

Today, Science Expo has grown to include several other outreach programs. These include a high school ambassador program, a teacher outreach program, and EXPOtential, the Science Expo alumni mentorship program. Through these outreach programs, the organization hopes to build a network of students who are involved in STEM.

== Programs ==
Science Expo features a variety of programs. High school students are invited to gather annually in February to participate in various workshops and are given opportunities to network with fellow peers and members of the STEM community. Keynote speakers have also been an exciting component to these conferences, with past speakers such as Dr. Steve Mann (Father of Wearable Computing) in 2013 and Dr. Brad Bass in 2012.

Furthermore, Science Expo has created additional programs such as meriSTEM, a two-stage design competition for any high school student to creatively showcase any aspect of STEM. Launched in 2013, the winner of the first meriSTEM competition was Netra Unni whose project displayed nuclear programming to create stem cells. EXPOtential was also launched in 2013 as a Science Expo alumni network which aims to connect previous delegates with mentors to collaborate and further facilitate one's potential in the field.

Science Expo is also known for their Ambassadors Program. The Ambassadors Program consists of more than 80 high school students from across Canada representing 40 different cities and regions. As an Ambassador for Science Expo, students support the Outreach Team by organizing various activities, initiatives, and events. Every November, more than 30 information sessions are organized, with the aim to catalyze a chain reaction of awareness on STEM opportunities. The purpose of this event is to inspire interest in STEM and to encourage students to participate academically outside of school. The value of this event does not lie in showcasing large scale opportunities though, but instead locally based opportunities and personal experiences. From the Ambassadors Program, students leave with developed soft and concrete skills, but also with experience, expanded professional networks, new friends, and the most important a memorable experience.
