= Sparsh (software) =

'SPARSH' is an interaction method to transfer data between digital devices by touch gestures. The Sparsh prototype system is designed and developed by Pranav Mistry, Suranga Nanayakkara of the MIT Media Lab. Sparsh uses touch-based interactions when transferring data, such as photos, text, video, or links, from one device to the other and the data transfer is handled via the cloud.

The user authentication is achieved by face recognition, fingerprint detection, or username-password combination. At present, Sparsh system supports Android and Windows platforms.

== End of Project ==
As of August 2024, and perhaps earlier, the website of the main developer no longer mentions the project.

The most recent updates in regard to the project may have been in 2013, with the main developer no longer updating their website. It currently simply mentions their career and inability to update the website linking to the archive of the SPARSH project. however, this also simply has the same message and as such does not provide any further information.

It is likely the lead developer, Pranav Mistry, has now left the project behind instead focusing on other elements of his career.

Although the project supports Android it can no longer be found on the google play store, SPARSH rather leading to a pensions app by the Government of India. Due to a lack of up to date websites, it is not possible to determine whether it can still be downloaded for windows or through other methods for Android.
