= Suranga Nanayakkara =

Sri Lankan computer scientist and inventor (born 1981)

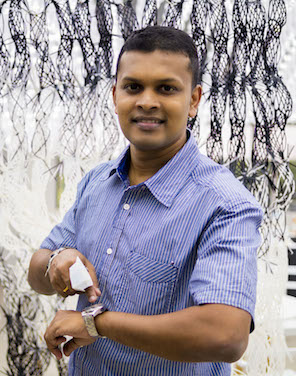
- Nanayakkara working with EyeRing
- Born: 1981 (age 44–45); Piliyandala, Colombo, Sri Lanka
- Education: National University of Singapore(B.Eng.); National University of Singapore(PhD); MIT Media Lab(Postdoc); Royal College, Colombo(Secondary)
- Known for: Inventor of FingerReader, SPARSH, StickEar and HapticChair
- Scientific career
- Workplaces: University of Auckland
- Doctoral advisor: Lonce Wyse, Elizabeth Taylor and SH Ong
- Other academic advisors: Pattie Maes
- Website: www.suranga.info

Suranga Nanayakkara (born 1981) is a Sri Lankan born computer scientist and inventor. As of 2021, he is the director of Augmented Human Lab and associate professor at the National University of Singapore. Before moving to Auckland in 2018, he was an assistant professor at Singapore University of Technology and Design. He is best known for his work on FingerReader and Haptic Chair. His research interests include Wearable Computing, Assistive Technology, Ubiquitous computing, AI, Collective intelligence and Robotics. MIT Technology Review honored Nanayakkara as one of the Innovators Under 35 for Asia Pacific Region 2014.

== Education and research ==
Suranga is from Piliyandala, in Colombo District, Sri Lanka. Having received his secondary education from Royal College, Colombo, he completed bachelor's degree in electrical and computer engineering from the National University of Singapore in Singapore. He holds a PhD in Engineering from National University of Singapore. Suranga spent half a year at University of Birmingham and half a year at University of Southern California under student exchange program. Later he was a postdoctoral researcher with Pattie Maes's Fluid Interfaces Group at MIT Media Lab.

== Career ==
- Since 2011, he has been directing the Augmented Human Lab.
- In 2018, he was invited to join University of Auckland as the first appointee of New Zealand Government's strategic entrepreneurial universities scheme
- He joined Singapore University of Technology and Design as an assistant professor in 2011

== Inventions ==
Suranga is best known for his work EyeRing - A finger-worn interface for seamless interactions Haptic Chair - Audio visual system to provide a more satisfying musical experience to deaf people and StickEars – a sound-based sticky note like device to make everyday objects more accessible. Among some of his other work, Suranga has invented SPARSH – a way to copy-paste data between digital devices; FingerDraw - way to extract colours and textures from nature and bring them into digital drawings.

=== Awards and achievements ===
- INK Fellow, 2016, by INK
- Ten Outstanding Young Persons (TOYP), Sri Lanka award 2015, by JCI Sri Lanka
- Young Innovator under 35 (MIT TR35) 2014 award, Asia Pacific region.
- Finalist, Singapore Challenge, Global Young Scientist Summit (GYSS’14).
- Interactive installation, iSwarm, selected for i Light Singapore 2014 Light show
