= Mouseless =

The Mouseless is a proposed input device for personal computers. A prototype Mouseless, designed by Pranav Mistry of the MIT Media Lab. Mouseless replaces conventional hardware mouse with a set of infrared laser strobe, an infrared camera and image recognition software. The laser beam is optically split into a wide beam illuminating an imaginary plane above the working desk. The camera captures the pattern of invisible infrared light as it illuminates user's hand. The user rests the palm on the desk and commands the system in the same way as he or she would do with a conventional mouse.

As of July 2010, the project has been presented to the media but has not been commercialized. According to Mistry' statement, the fully functional prototype of the Mouseless costs around $20.
