= Edusim =

Free virtual reality interactive education software

- Release: September 2007
- Written in: Squeak
- Engine: Cobalt
- Operating system: Windows, macOS, Linux
- Available in: English
- Type: Virtual world interactive whiteboard
- License: code: MIT media: at least mostly CC BY-SA-NC
- Website: edusim3d.com

Edusim on an interactive whiteboard Students at the Greenbush Southeast Kansas Education Service Center editing and interacting with 3D dinosaur models on their classroom interactive whiteboard. Edusim - Web Edition Edusim web edition with the in-world coding option menu.

Edusim is a cave automatic virtual environment "Immersive Touch" 3D natural user interface (NUI)-based concept of lesson driven (multi-user) 3D virtual worlds on the classroom interactive whiteboard or classroom interactive surface. The Edusim concept is demonstrated by the Edusim free and open-source multi-user 3D Open Cobalt virtual world platform and authoring tool kit modified for the classroom interactive whiteboard or surface. The Edusim application is a modified edition of the open source Open Cobalt Project and relies heavily on the affordances of direct manipulation of 3D virtual learning models and constructionist learning principles.

== Goals ==
The goal of the Edusim project is to provide an example platform, and initial resources for demonstrating the use of lesson driven 3D virtual environments in the classroom or for training purposes using interactive surfaces and/or whiteboards as the hardware platform for the "immersive touch" 3D NUI direct manipulation of the 3D learning content. For example, students are able to play with 3D renderings of dinosaur fossils and study the flight of birds from every angle.

== History ==
The Edusim project originated and the term "immersive touch" 3D natural user interface was coined in September 2007 at the Greenbush Education Service Center in Southeast Kansas as an effort to bring an engaging 3D experience to the classroom interactive whiteboard. Pilot groups were established with 6th and 7th grade middle school students throughout Southeast Kansas to observe how students would engage with the software, and how the user interface would need to be augmented to account for the affordances of the interactive whiteboard, and the usability of the students.

== Immersive Touch ==
Immersive Touch natural user interface is defined as the direct manipulation of 3D virtual environment objects using single or multi-touch surface hardware in multi-user 3D virtual environments. Coined first to describe and define the natural user interface learning principles associated with Edusim. Immersive Touch natural user interface now appears to be taking on a broader focus and meaning with the broader adaption of surface and touch driven hardware such as the iPhone, iPod Touch, iPad, and a growing list of other hardware.

== Emerging and potential immersive touch environments ==
- Smartboard 3D Tools: Smartech deployed the first commercial Edusim UI in their 3D Tools product.
- Google Earth on a collaborative interactive surface.
- iPad
