= Blinkbot =

Vision interface technology

BlinkBot is a wearable glasses system that detects the wearer's gaze and blink and uses this to command a robot. The system was developed by Pranav Mistry of MIT Media Lab (and vice-president of Samsung Electronics since 2014) and Kentaro Ishii of JST and first published in 2010.
