= Pranav Mistry =

Indian computer scientist (born 1981)

- Born: 14 May 1981 (age 45); Palanpur, Gujarat, India
- Education: Vidhyamandir School,Palanpur Bachelor's in Computer Science and Engineering - Gujarat University Master of Design - IIT Bombay PhD - MIT
- Known for: Inventor of SixthSense, Mouseless, SPARSH, TeleTouch and head of team of Samsung Galaxy GEAR
- Awards: 2009 TR35 by Technology Review; 2010 Creativity 50
- Scientific career
- Workplaces: Samsung Electronics

Pranav Mistry (born 14 May 1981) is an Indian computer scientist and inventor. He is the former president and CEO of STAR Labs (Samsung Technology & Advanced Research Labs). He is currently the founder and CEO of TWO, an Artificial Reality startup. He is best known for his work on SixthSense, Samsung Galaxy Gear and Project Beyond.

== Career ==
Mistry joined Samsung as the Director of Research in 2012, and served as the Global Vice President of it. He introduced Samsung Galaxy Gear smart watch in September 2013. Before joining MIT, Pranav worked as a UX Researcher with Microsoft. In the past, he has worked with Google, CMU, NASA, UNESCO, Japan Science & Technology Agency. He was the Global Senior Vice President of search at Samsung and the head of Think Tank Team. He was the president and CEO of STAR Labs. In July 2021, he founded a new Artificial Reality startup, TWO.

== Innovations ==
Mistry is best known for his work on SixthSense. Among some of his other works, he has also invented Mouseless – an invisible computer mouse; Sparsh – a novel way to copy-paste data between digital devices; Quickies – intelligent sticky notes that can be searched, located and can send reminders and messages; Blinkbot – a gaze and blink controlled robot; a pen that can draw in 3D; and a public map that can act as Google of the physical world. He has also contributed to the development of Samsung's NEON.

== Recognition ==
Pranav's research on SixthSense earned him the 2009 Invention Award. He was also named on MIT's Technology Review as one of the top 35 innovators in the world. In 2010, He was named on Creativity Magazine's Creativity 50. Chris Anderson has referred Mistry as "one of the best inventors in the world". Mistry has also been listed in "15 Asian Scientists to Watch", by Asian Scientist Magazine. He has also received recognition from GQ India, listing him as one of the most powerful digital Indians, and India Today, listing him as one of the "37 Indians of Tomorrow".

He was honoured as Young Global Leader 2013, by WEF.

== Personal life ==
Mistry was born in Palanpur in Gujarat state of India. He married Farrah Chen.
