= Sensorial transposition =

Remote reality technique

Sensorial transposition is a technique in remote reality where the sensation from one sense is transferred to another, or where feedback is received through an alternate sense. For example, a thermographic camera can visually display temperature, giving a visual impression of heat, which is not the typical way humans experience temperature. This allows humans to see temperature variations as colors on a screen, making it easier to understand and interpret thermal data visually. It is about using technology to expand and enhance human sensory experiences.
