= EyeTap =

Wearable computer worn in front of the eye

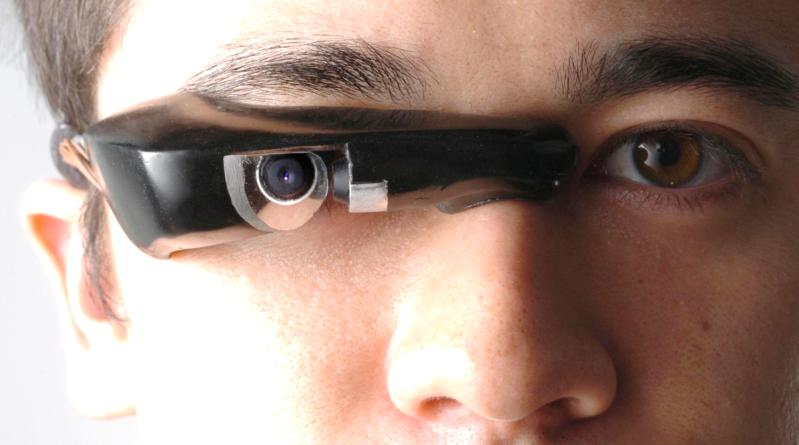
Man wearing a one-eyed injection-molded EyeTap

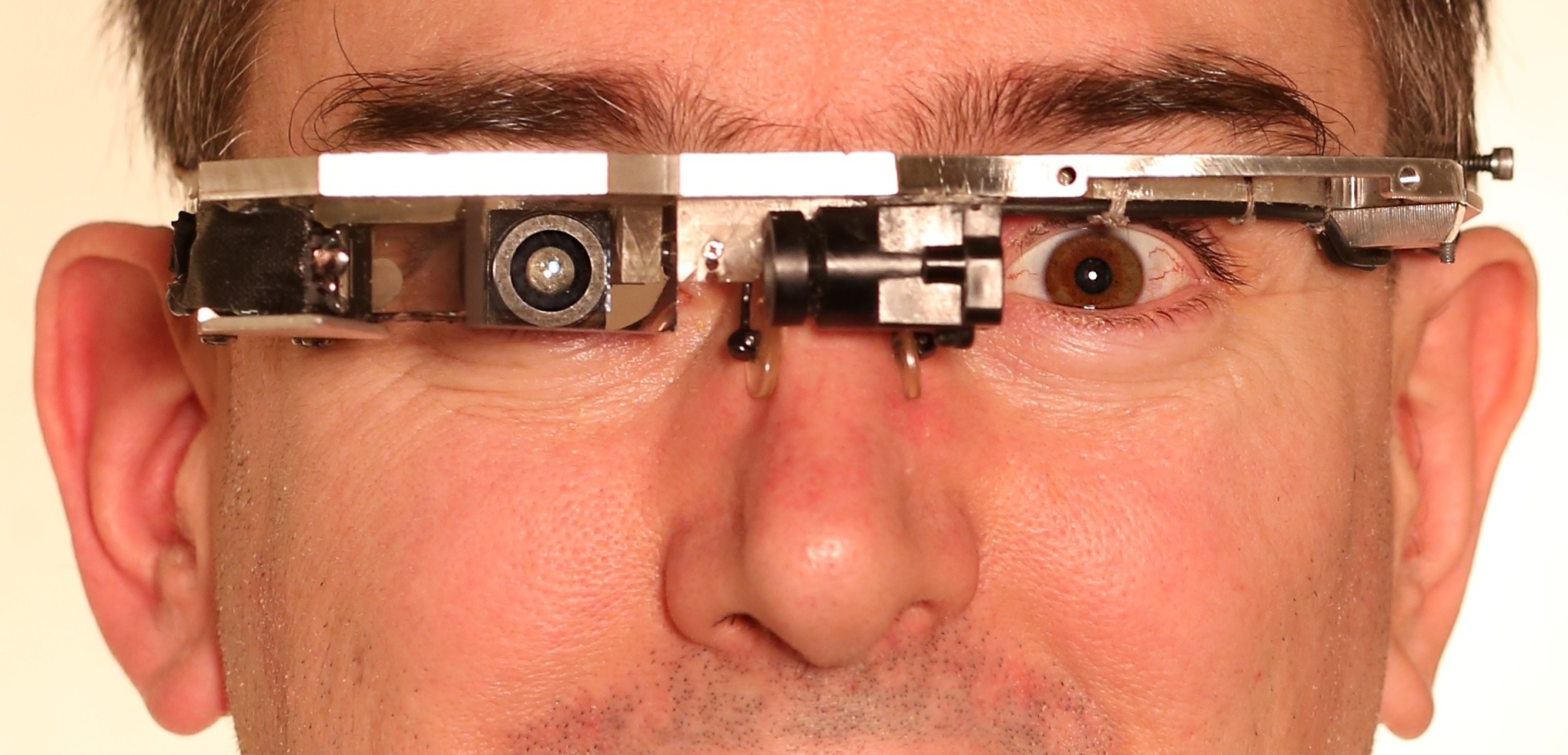
EyeTap inventor Steve Mann wearing a metal frame Laser EyeTap (computer-controlled laser light source run from "GlassEye" camera)

An EyeTap is a concept for a wearable computing device that is worn in front of the eye that acts as a camera to record the scene available to the eye as well as a display to superimpose computer-generated imagery on the original scene available to the eye. This structure allows the user's eye to operate as both a monitor and a camera as the EyeTap intakes the world around it and augments the image the user sees allowing it to overlay computer-generated data over top of the normal world the user would perceive.

In order to capture what the eye is seeing as accurately as possible, an EyeTap uses a beam splitter to send the same scene (with reduced intensity) to both the eye and a camera. The camera then digitizes the reflected image of the scene and sends it to a computer. The computer processes the image and then sends it to a projector. The projector sends the image to the other side of the beam splitter so that this computer-generated image is reflected into the eye to be superimposed on the original scene. Stereo EyeTaps modify light passing through both eyes, but many research prototypes (mainly for reasons of ease of construction) only tap one eye.

EyeTap is also the name of an organization founded by inventor Steve Mann to develop and promote EyeTap-related technologies such as wearable computers.

== Possible uses ==
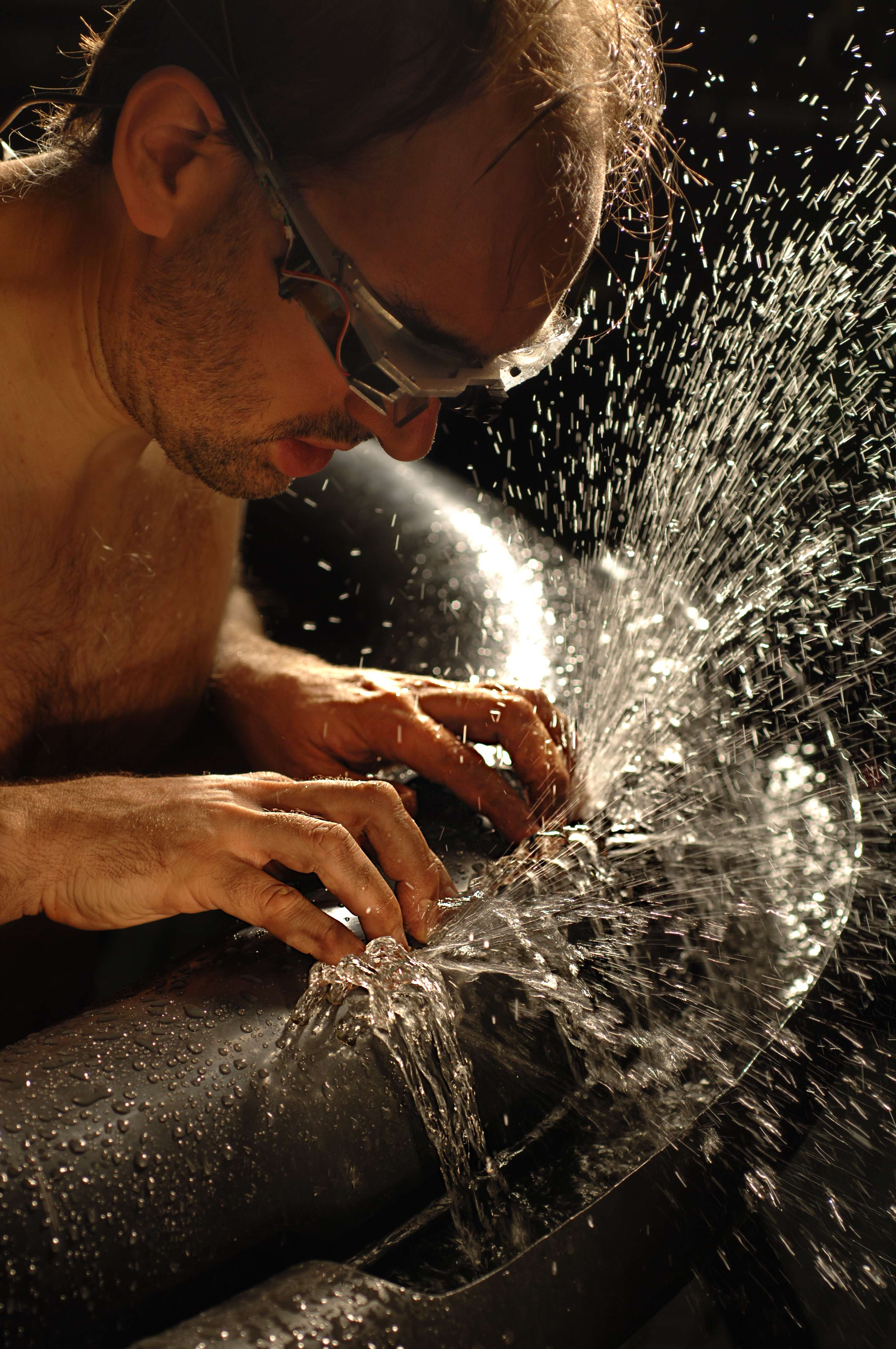
Inventor Steve Mann using weather-resistant EyeTap together with a hydraulophone

An EyeTap is somewhat like a head-up display (HUD). The important difference is that the scene available to the eye is also available to the computer that projects the head-up display. This enables the EyeTap to modify the computer generated scene in response to the natural scene. One use, for instance, would be a sports EyeTap: here the wearer, while in a stadium, would be able to follow a particular player in a field and have the EyeTap display statistics relevant to that player as a floating box above the player. Another practical use for the EyeTap would be in a construction yard as it would allow the user to reference the blueprints, especially in a 3D manner, to the current state of the building, display a list of current materials and their current locations as well perform basic measurements. Or, even in the business world, the EyeTap has great potential, for it would be capable of delivering to the user constant up to date information on the stock market, the user's corporation, and meeting statuses. On a more day-to-day basis some of Steve Mann's first uses for the technology was using it to keep track of names of people and places, his to-do lists, and keeping track of his other daily ordeals. The EyeTap Criteria are an attempt to define how close a real, practical device comes to such an ideal. EyeTaps could have great use in any field where the user would benefit from real-time interactive information that is largely visual in nature. This is sometimes referred to as computer-mediated reality, commonly known as augmented reality.

Eyetap has been explored as a potential tool for individuals with visual disabilities due to its abilities to direct visual information to parts of the retina that function well. As well, Eyetap's role in sousveillance has been explored by Mann, Jason Nolan and Barry Wellman.

== Possible side effects ==
Users may find that they experience side effects such as headaches and difficulty sleeping if usage occurs shortly before sleep. Mann finds that due to his extensive use of the device that going without it can cause him to feel "nauseous, unsteady, naked" when he removes it.

== Cyborglogs & EyeTaps ==
The EyeTap has applications in the world of cyborg logging, as it allows the user the ability to perform real-time visual capture of their daily lives from their own point of view. In this way, the EyeTap could be used to create a lifelong cyborg log or “glog” of the user's life and the events they participate in, potentially recording enough media to allow producers centuries in the future to present the user's life as interactive entertainment (or historical education) to consumers of that era.

== History ==
Steve Mann created the first version of the EyeTap, which consisted of a computer in a backpack wired up to a camera and its viewfinder which in turn was rigged to a helmet. Ever since this first version, it has gone through multiple models as wearable computing evolves, allowing the EyeTap to shrink down to a smaller and less weighty version.

Currently the EyeTap consists of the eyepiece used to display the images, the keypad which the user can use to interface with the EyeTap and have it perform the desired tasks, a CPU which can be attached to most articles of clothing and in some cases even a Wi-Fi device so the user can access the Internet and online data.

== Principle of operation ==
The EyeTap is essentially a half-silvered mirror in front of the user's eye, reflecting some of the light into a sensor. The sensor then sends the image to the aremac, a display device capable of displaying data at any fitting depth. The output rays from the aremac are reflected off the half-silvered mirror back into the eye of the user along with the original light rays.

In these cases, the EyeTap views infrared light, as well as the overall design schematic of how the EyeTap manipulates lightrays.

A conceptual diagram of an EyeTap:

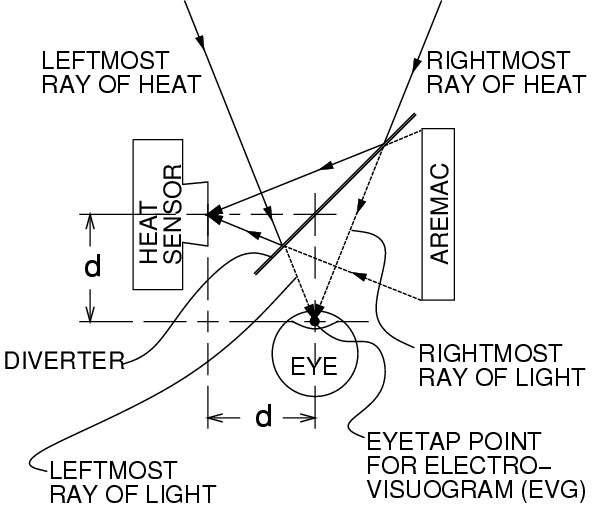

== Components ==
CCD Cameras (Charge-coupled device) are the most common type of digital camera used today.

== See also ==
- Smartglasses
- Optical head-mounted display
- Google Glass
