= SixthSense =

Gesture-based wearable computer system

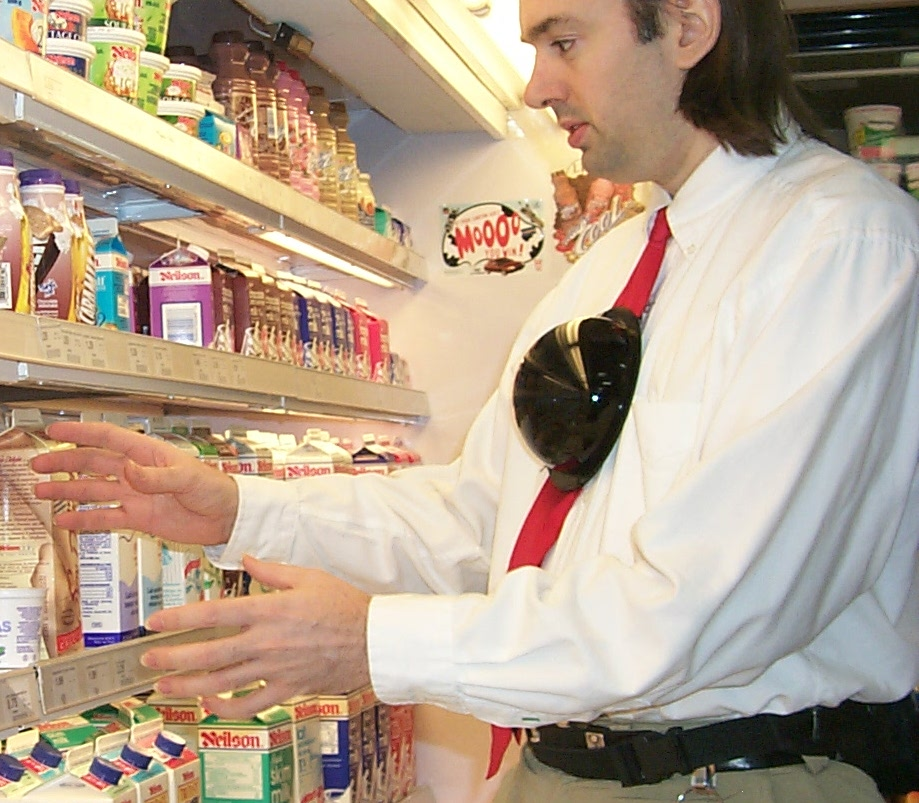
Steve Mann wearing a camera+projector dome in 1998, which he used as one node of the collaborative Telepointer system

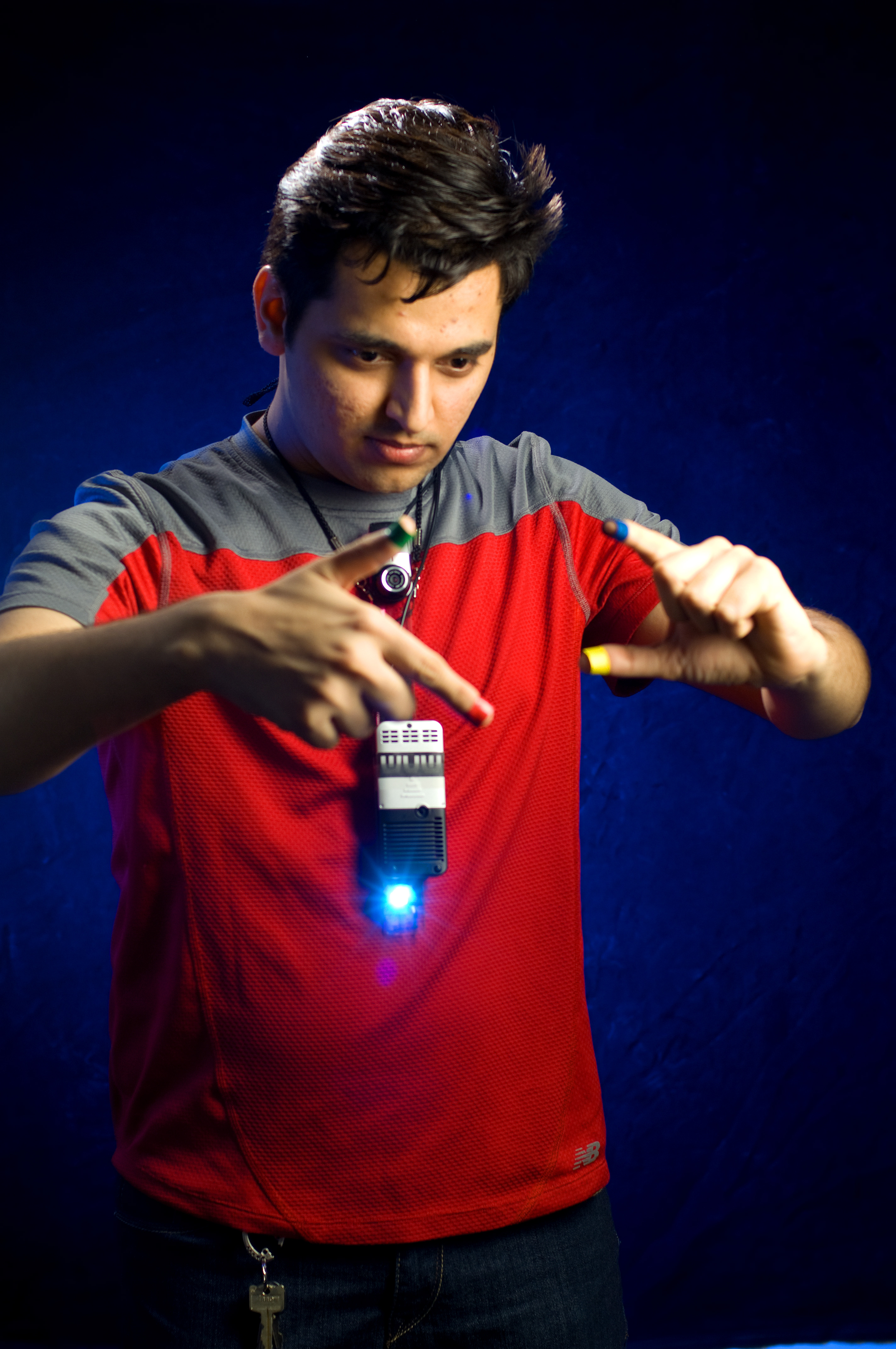
Pranav Mistry wearing a similar device in 2012, which he and Maes and Chang named "WUW", for Wear yoUr World.

SixthSense is a gesture-based wearable computer system developed at MIT Media Lab by Steve Mann in 1994 and 1997 (headworn gestural interface), and 1998 (neckworn version), and further developed by Pranav Mistry (also at MIT Media Lab), in 2009, both of whom developed both hardware and software for both headworn and neckworn versions of it. It comprises a headworn or neck-worn pendant that contains both a data projector and camera. Headworn versions were built at MIT Media Lab in 1997 (by Steve Mann) that combined cameras and illumination systems for interactive photographic art, and also included gesture recognition (e.g. finger-tracking using colored tape on the fingers).

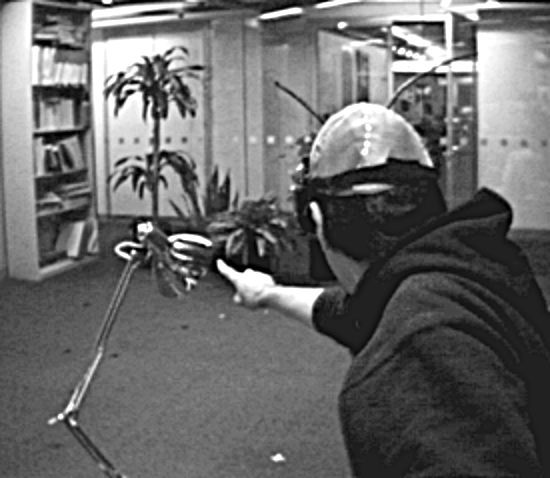
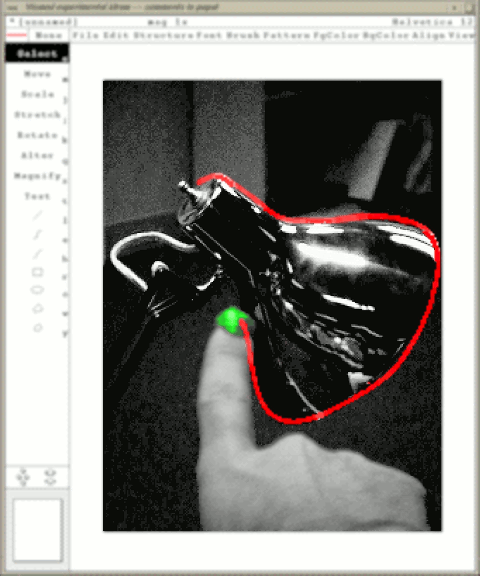
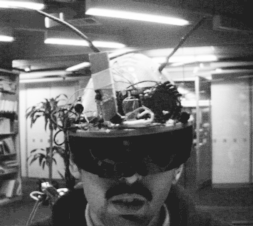
1994 prototype of headworn SixthSense gesture-based wearable computing apparatus invented, designed, built, and worn by Steve Mann, MIT Media Lab. Finger-pointing gesture to outline and select a physical object. Front-view shows cameras attached to head-mounted display with wireless communications antennae on helmet.

SixthSense is a name for extra information supplied by a wearable computer, such as the device called EyeTap (Mann), Telepointer (Mann), and "WuW" (Wear yoUr World) by Pranav Mistry.

== Origin of the name ==
Sixth Sense technology (a camera combined with a light source) was developed in 1997 as a headworn device, and in 1998 as a neckworn object, but the Sixth Sense name for this work was not coined and published until 2001, when Mann coined the term "Sixth Sense" to describe such devices.

Mann referred to this wearable computing technology as affording a "Synthetic Synesthesia of the Sixth Sense", believing that wearable computing and digital information could act in addition to the five traditional senses. Ten years later, Pattie Maes, also with MIT Media Lab, used the term "Sixth Sense" in this same context, in a TED talk.

Similarly, other inventors have used the term sixth-sense technology to describe new capabilities that augment the traditional five human senses. For example, in U.S. patent no. 9,374,397, timo platt et als, refer to their new communications invention as creating a new social and personal sense, i.e., a "metaphorical sixth sense", enabling users (while retaining their privacy and anonymity) to sense and share the "stories" and other attributes and information of those around them.
