= Equiveillance =

State of veillance between surveillance and sousveillance

Equiveillance is a state of equilibrium, or a desire to attain a state of equilibrium, between surveillance and sousveillance. It is sometimes confused with transparency. The balance (equilibrium) provided by equiveillance allows individuals to construct their own cases from evidence they gather themselves, rather than merely having access to surveillance data that could possibly incriminate them.

The Dutch perspective on equiveillance puts it in a sociopolitical context in regards to a balance between individuals and the state.

Equiveillance uses sousveillance, in addition to transparency, to preserve the contextual integrity of surveillance data. For example, lifelong capture of personal experiences provides alternative viewpoints in addition to external surveillance data, to prevent the surveillance-only data from being taken out-of-context.

== Ubiquitous computing ==
Equiveillance represents a situation where all parties of a society or economy are empowered to be able to use the tools of accountability to make beneficial decisions. The increasing trend to record information from our environment, and of ourselves creates the need to delineate the relationships between privacy, surveillance, and sousveillance.

Equiveillance addresses the balance between ubiquitous computing (computing installed throughout our environment) and wearable computing (computing installed upon our own bodies). As personal cell phones store more information and have the capacity to share it, wearable and mobile computing makes manifest the ability for an individual, or small group of individuals, to monitor larger institutional systems with a goal of developing systems of transparency and accountability. In the same way that large institutions, such as governments or corporations, store information about the buying habits of the public through integrated surveillance practice and ubiquitous computing infrastructure, individuals can act as consumer activists though a system of inverse surveillance that is based upon a wearable computing infrastructure that assists in maximizing personal privacy and alerting one of information being recorded about the self. Such actions lead to an equiveillant state, as power and respect are shared in a more balanced way.

Panoptic surveillance was described by Michel Foucault in the context of a prison in which prisoners were isolated from each other but visible at all times by guards. Surveillance isolates individuals from one another by setting forth a one-way visibility to authority figures, leading to social fragmentation.

Sousveillance has a community-based origin, such as a personal electronic diary (or weblog), made public on the World Wide Web. Sousveillance brings together individuals, by influencing a large city to function with the social connectivity of a small town, with the pitfalls of gossip, but also the benefits of a sense of community participation, where the sousveillance environment generates a greater sense of responsibility.

Ubiquitous computing ("ubicomp"), also known as pervasive computing ("pervcomp"), is the integration of computers with the environment. Ubiquitous computing tends to rely on cooperation of the immediate infrastructure in the environment, but also has a tendency to centralize information, and hence, centralize authority structures. It also creates segregation, and has implications for social rights such as education and healthcare. Individuals are sorted and classified within a ubiquitous computing environment, leading to a new form of segregation. Ubiquitous computing also places emphasis on copyright law and undermines creative environments due to the controlling tendencies of authority.

Wearable computing ("wearcomp") refers to portable, wearable computing technologies. Wearcomp doesn't require any special infrastructure in the environment, as the computer is self-contained and self-reliant. With sousveillant computing, it is possible for the focus of control to be more distributed rather than centralized.

Ubiquitous computing environments may use sensors and surveillance systems as part of their infrastructure. Personal cybernetics intersects personal imaging and glogging (CyborgLogging), practices where individuals store and archive information for personal use.

== Equiveillance table ==
Equiveillance establishes a social balance between surveillance and sousveillance, as outlined in a general series of comparisons that is known in the published literature as the "equiveillance table". There are two kinds of situations that occur when this social balance does not exist: inequiveillance, in which there is a one-sided nature to surveillance (this is the most common situation), and disequiveillance, which is when the balance is not provably one-sided, but, rather, is unequal but not clearly in one or the other direction.

== Inequiveillance (disequiveillance) ==
Equiveillance represents a balance of the power relationships that surveillance and sousveillance touch upon. When there is an imbalance, social consequences can range from loss of privacy, to social reactions that in the aggregate lead to unrest and political instability. The idea of disequiveillance is described by Paul Virilio in his treatise on Dromology and the possibility of freedom loss as an accident of our modern world and how it relates to terrorism and war. In this context, the lack of equiveillance (disequiveillance) refers to the anthropological consequences of a world filled with continuous recording devices that encourage a despotic form of government with a tendency to intrude upon the lives of its citizens.

The evolving field of sousveillance, stems in part from recent research on the topic of surveillance and inverse-surveillance, shedding light on how media technology is changing our sense of privacy and human freedom. Privacy becomes increasingly a measure of freedom and its control central to personal autonomy.

Increasingly, remembering is influenced by both personal and public search engines, as computing is becoming increasingly dependent upon the human–computer interaction. The issue of being able to control the amount of personal information that escapes and is recorded in the many machines that make up evolving ubiquitous computing world stresses the importance of equiveillance. The impact of surveillance will be increasingly related to the impact of increasing computer storage space and data mining processing speed.

A 2005 article by Margaret Papandreou entitled "Is nothing Sacred" also highlights the issue of disequiveillance and how the theft of personal communications with her son undermined her freedom of thought. Mrs Papandreou's personal computer was entered by hackers with malicious intent, with multiple emails, and personal information downloaded and eventually published in book form. The issue of freedom of the press, vs theft of personal property and electronic trespassing, developed into a subsequent legal action against the journalist and member of the Greek Parliament, Liana Kanelli. The issue of public vs. private space comes into the debate. The practice of spying as a political technique creates a flashback to how previous Greek politicians where undermined via covert eavesdropping and a subsequent outcome from the previous decades of the Greek Civil War. The complexity of this case becomes twofold when the person surveillanced is a concerned citizen, and not a politician. Furthermore, the issue of taking personal electronic communication out of context for political and financial gain creates the issue of disequiveillance. This can happen on a personal level, or on a larger social, or institutional level.

"The correspondence, which included e-mails, was published in late 2000 and early 2001, in the Nemesis magazine, which was run by journalist and MP Liana Kanelli. It was unclear how Kanelli laid hands on the letters, in which the US-born Papandreou advised the FM on his political career, urging him to make use of non-governmental organizations such as the Andreas Papandreou Foundation and the Andreas Papandreou Institute for Strategic and Development Studies (ISTAME). Nemesis claimed Papandreou had been trying to influence Greek politics."

The foundations of human freedom also are rooted in the idea of social contract. Biased comments from the conclusion of documents obtained without a search warrant, and against the principles of legal procedure create an unfair forum for judging and condemnation and expose some of the problems of how electronic freedom can be misused towards a systemic persecution and misrepresentation. It also exposes how social instability can rapidly cause a society to evolve into a prison state. Order is maintained in systematic dissolution of freedom towards a government that operates more like a prison rather than a body of persons made up of "free individuals" with an overemphasis of everyone watching everyone, with anyone becoming an informant for whatever side that may be competing for power.

Unbalanced surveillance, and disequiveillance can rapidly devolve society towards the en-masse phenomena such as racism, scapegoating and even mob reactions towards an individual. It is also of importance to realize that justice is not rooted in vengeance, but rather, the law.

The Margaret Papandreou case highlights the issue of victimization through use of the media as a form of propaganda. The social emphasis of a big brother society is rapidly transitioning Balkan nations via the prevalence of media support of such systems with an increasingly legal disregard for individual privacy.

The issue of privacy as part of freedom is in conflict with an absolutely transparent society where all things become recorded and available. The ability to mediate one's visibility increasingly intersects with the concept of wearable computing, as a form of sheltering the individual from a world filled with recorders and sensors. The ability to control one's personal information is increasingly part of how one is to maintain one's personal and free space. Hence protecting one's privacy also intersects with the concept of sousveillance.
