= Holographic optical element =

A holographic optical element (HOE) is an optical component (mirror, lens, directional diffuser, etc.) that produces holographic images using principles of diffraction. HOE is most commonly used in transparent displays, 3D imaging, and certain scanning technologies. The shape and structure of the HOE is dependent on the piece of hardware it is needed for, and the coupled wave theory is a common tool used to calculate the diffraction efficiency or grating volume that helps with the design of an HOE. Early concepts of the holographic optical element can be traced back to the mid-1900s, coinciding closely with the start of holography coined by Dennis Gabor. The application of 3D visualization and displays is ultimately the end goal of the HOE; however, the cost and complexity of the device has hindered the rapid development toward full 3D visualization. The HOE is also used in the development of augmented reality(AR) by companies such as Google with Google Glass or in research universities that look to utilize HOEs to create 3D imaging without the use of eye-wear or head-wear. Furthermore, the ability of the HOE to allow for transparent displays have caught the attention of the US military in its development of better head-up displays (HUD) which is used to display crucial information for aircraft pilots.

== Early development of HOE ==
The holographic optical element is closely linked to holography (science of making holograms), a term proposed by Dennis Gabor in 1948. Since the idea of holography came around, much has been done over the next few decades to try and create holograms. Around the 1960s, Yuri Nikolaevich Denisyuk, a graduate student from Leningrad, recognized that perhaps the wave front of light can be recorded as a standing wave in a photographic emulsion (light crystal) by using monochromatic light which can then reflect light back to reproduce the wave front. This essentially describes a holographic mirror (one of the first HOEs created) and fixed the issue of overlapping images. However, there was little practical use in Denisyuk's proposal, and his colleagues dismissed his results. It was not until around the mid-1960s that Denisyuk's proposals resurfaced after some development from Emmett Leith and Juris Upatnieks. These two associates encoded and reconstructed images with a two-step hologram process on photographic transparency. More experiments for holographic instruments, such as the holographic stereogram developed by Lloyd Cross in the 1970s, took the imaging process developed by Leith and Uptanieks and arranged them into vertical strips that were curved into a cylinder. These strips act as an aperture that light passes through, so when a viewer is to look through them, a 3D image can be seen. This demonstrates a very simple version of the diffraction concepts that are still utilized in the production of HOEs and a prototype for 3D glasses.

== Classifications ==
=== Volume and thin HOEs ===
HOEs differ from other optical devices since they do not bend light with curvature and shape. Instead, they use diffraction principles (the distribution of light as it passes through an aperture) to diffract light waves by reconstructing a new wavefront using a corresponding material profile, making HOEs a type of diffraction optical element (DOE). Two common types of HOEs that exist are volume HOEs and thin HOEs that are dependent. A thin HOE (one containing a thin layer of holographic grating) has a low diffraction efficiency, causing light beams to diffract in various directions. Conversely, volume HOE types (ones containing multiple layers of holographic gratings) are more efficient since there is more control on the direction of light due to a high diffractive efficiency. Most of the calculations done to create HOEs are usually the volume type HOEs.

=== Reflection-type and transmission-type HOEs ===
In addition to being a thin or volume HOE, an HOE can also be affected by positioning, which determines whether it is a transmission type or reflection type. These types of HOE are determined by the position of the object beam and reference beam in relation to the recording material of those beams: being on the same side indicates a transmission HOE and otherwise a reflection HOE. Some materials that are most commonly used in manufacturing HOEs include silver halide emulsion and dichromate gelatin.

== Applications ==
=== Aerospace industry ===
In the early 2000s NASA conducted a test known as the Holographic Airborne Rotating Lidar Instrument Experiment(HARLIE) that utilized dichromate gelatin-based volume HOE sandwiched between float glass. The objective of the test was to find a new method of measuring surface and atmospheric parameters that could reduce the size, mass, and angular momentum of a spaceborne lidar systems. The ability of HOE to be made as curved or bendable allows it to be used in the construction of head up displays(HUD) or head mount displays(HMD). Additionally, transparency can be achieved due to the selectivity of the volume grating that is used to diffract light at a specific incident angle or wavelength. This allows for the development of transparent head-up displays that convey information to aircraft pilots and conserves cockpit space. The US military is currently running tests on these new aircraft displays.

=== Next-level augmented reality ===
One use of a holographic optical element is in thin-profile combiner lenses for optical head-mounted displays. A reflective volume hologram is used to extract progressively a collimated image that was directed via total internal reflection in an optical waveguide. The spectral and angular Bragg selectivity of the reflective volume hologram makes it particularly well-suited for a combiner using such light sources as RGB LEDs, providing both good see-through quality and good quality of the projected image. This usage has been implemented in smart glasses by Konica Minolta and Sony.

One of the goals in the design of an HOE is to try and create 3D visualization and the closest thing to that is augmented reality. The most common types of augmented reality come from head mount displays or glasses type displays, which can be considered the first type of 3D displays. Some examples of this type of display include Microsoft's HoloLens I, II, Google Glass, and Magic Leap. Items like these are often very expensive due to the high cost of materials used to produce HOEs. There is also a second type of 3D visualization method that looks to replicate 3D objects through the creation of light fields. This type of visualization is closer to the ones seen in science fiction films or video games. Theoretical ways in which HOE can be used to bring the second type into fruition have been proposed. One proposal from affiliates of Beihang University and Sichuan University in 2019 suggests the use of micro lens array(MLA) HOE along with a display panel can create a 3D image. The proposed technology works by having the MLA type HOE form a spherical wave of arrays. Light is then distributed across this spherical array to form a 3D image. At its current state, the downside to the display is its low resolution quality.

== Mathematical theories relevant for HOE construction ==
=== Coupled-wave theory ===
The coupled-wave theory is a crucial part of the design of volume HOEs. It was first written about by Herwig Kogelnik in 1969 and contains mathematical models that determine the wavelength and angular selectivity(these factors determine how efficiently something may be able to adjust and transmit light at a certain angle or wavelength) of certain materials. Several premises are given by the theory: it is valid for large diffraction efficiencies(measures how much optical power is diffracted at a given spot) and its derivation is done on the basis that the monochromatic light incident is near the Bragg angle (a small angle between a light beam and a plane of crystals) and perpendicular to the plane of incidence (a plane that contains both a ray of light and a surface that usually acts as a mirror at a certain point). Since the HOE works by diffracting light by constructing new waves, trying to get the thick HOE material to diffract light near the Bragg angle will make for more efficient wavefront construction. These equations are used to adjust the hologram grating volume and increase the diffraction efficiency of the HOE during production and can be applied to both transmission type HOEs or reflection type HOEs.

Classical grating equation accounts for the incident angle $\alpha$, diffraction angle $\beta$, surface grating $v$, wavelength in free space $\lambda$, and the integer order of diffraction $m$:

$$mv\lambda = \sin\alpha_0 + \sin\beta_0.$$

Bragg equation for plane transmission accounts for $1/v$ as $\Lambda$ and the index of refraction as $n_1$:

$$m\lambda = \Lambda2 n_1 \sin\alpha_1.$$

Spectral bandwidth approximation accounts for the spectral bandwidth $\Delta\lambda_f$ and the grating thickness $d$:

$$\Delta\lambda_f/\lambda \approx (\Lambda/d) \cot\alpha_1.$$

Angular bandwidth approximation accounts for $\alpha _f$ as the angular bandwidth at FWHM (full width at half the maximum):

$$\Delta\alpha_f \approx \Lambda/d.$$

Diffraction efficiency equation accounts for $\Delta n_1$ as the intensity of the grating modulation, $\eta_t$ as the diffraction efficiency for TM mode (polarization parallel to the plane of incidence), and $\cos(2\alpha_1)$ as the reduced effective coupling constant:

$$\eta_t = \sin^2[\pi\Delta n_1 d \cos(2\alpha_1)/(\lambda \cos\alpha_1)].$$

Wave propagation in the grating as described by scalar wave equation accounts for $E(x, z)$ as the complex amplitude in the y component and $k(x, z)$ as the propagation constant that is spatially modulated:

$$\nabla^2 E + k^2 E = 0.$$

=== Lenslet calculations ===
Lenslet (very small lenses measured in micrometers) shape variation calculations that may help determine the distance, wavelength, and middle-mask aperture that determine HOE output for HOEs acting like a lens.

Horizontal direction calculation: $\delta_x$ is the horizontal position of the speckle, $h$ is the parameters of the middle mask aperture(mask placed near lens aperture) perpendicular to the horizontal position of the speckle(height), $\lambda$ is the wavelength, and $f$ is the working focal distance,

$$\delta_x = 2 \lambda f/h.$$

Vertical direction calculation: $\delta_y$ is the vertical position of the speckle, $w$ is the parameters of the middle mask aperture(mask placed near lens aperture) perpendicular to the vertical position of the speckle (width), $\lambda$ is the wavelength, and $f$ is the working focal distance,

$$\delta_y = 2 \lambda f/w.$$
