= Optical see-through head-mounted display =

Type of wearable device

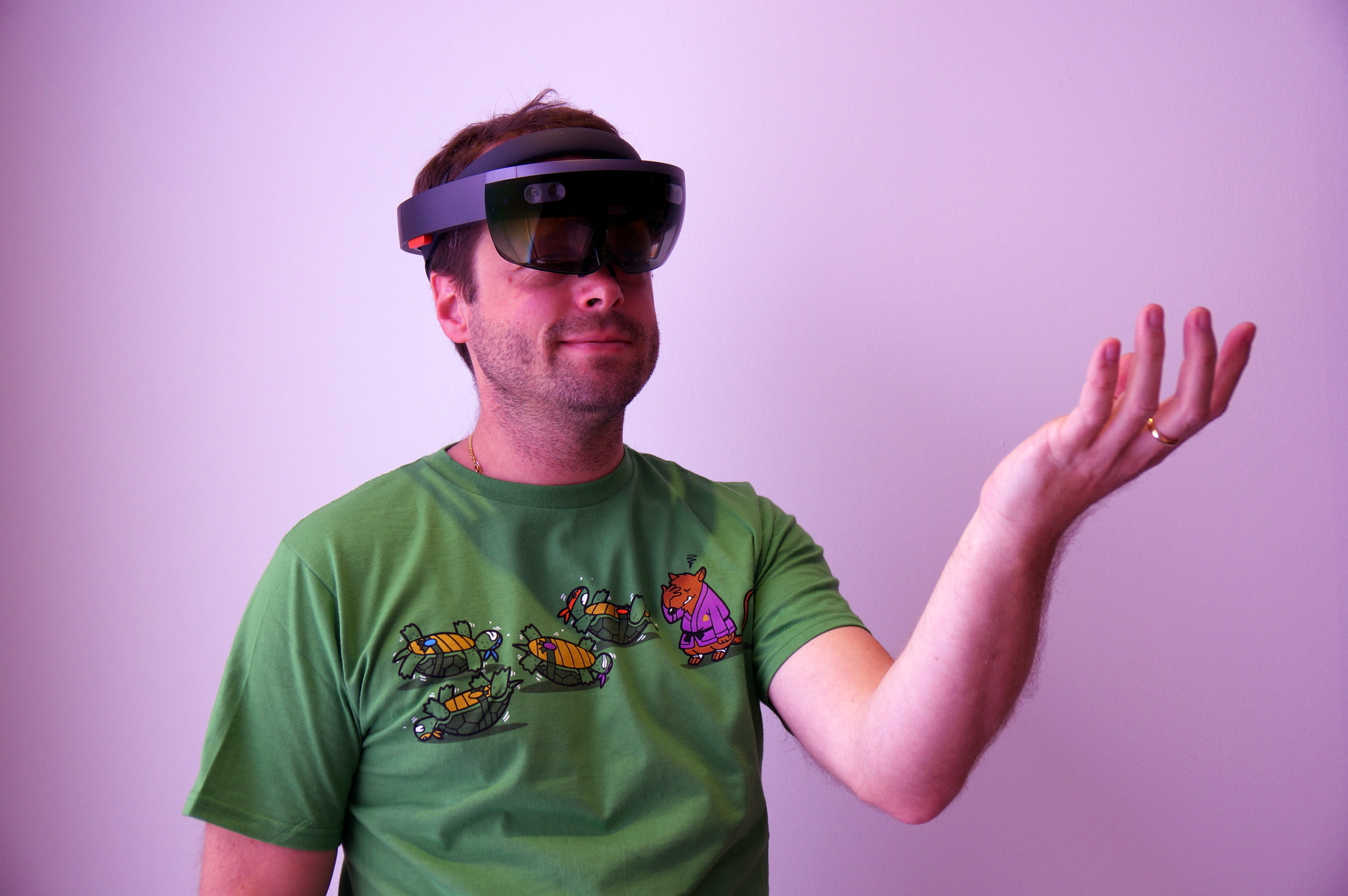
A stereoscopic optical see-through head-mounted display

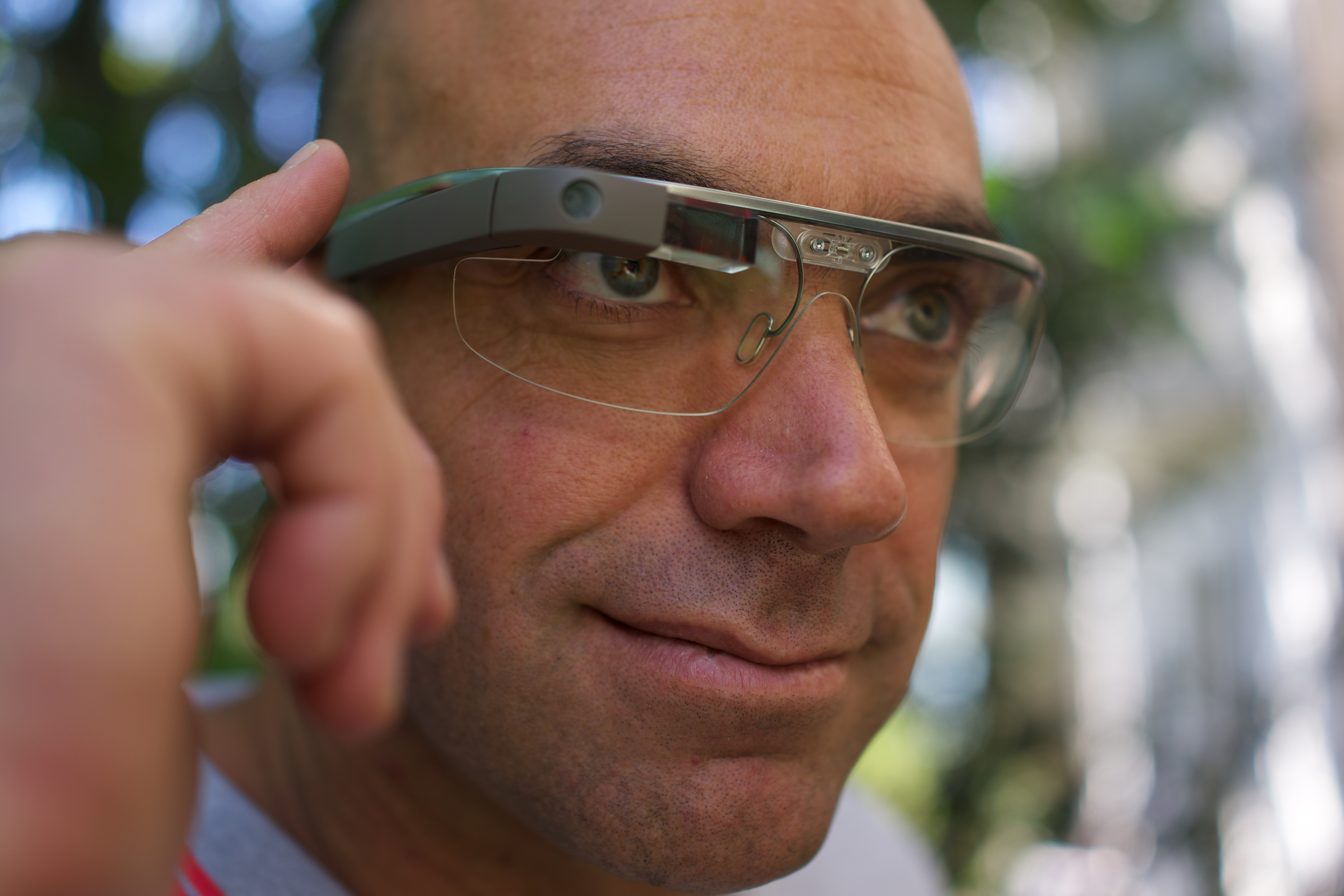
A man controls Google Glass using the touchpad built into the side of the device.

An optical see-through head-mounted display (OST-HMD) is a wearable device that has the capability of reflecting projected images as well as allowing the user to see through it, in contrast to typical head-mounted displays, which still use optical components, but are not see-through, such as virtual reality headsets. In some cases, this may qualify as augmented reality (AR) technology. OHMD technology has existed since 1997 in various forms, but despite a number of attempts from industry, has yet to have had major commercial success.

Commercial optical see-through head-mounted displays include Google Glass and Microsoft HoloLens. Other devices include the NVIS nVisor ST, Vuzix M300, and Meta 2 from Meta.

== History ==
See-through head-mounted displays date to 1968, when Ivan E. Sutherland demonstrated a stereoscopic head-mounted display (Ivan Sutherland's head-mounted 3D display) using half-silvered mirrors (a beam combiner) to overlay computer graphics on the real world.

== Types ==
Various techniques have existed for see-through HMDs. Most of these techniques can be summarized into two main families: "Curved Mirror" (or Curved Combiner) based and "Waveguide" or "Light-guide" based. The curved mirror technique has been used by Vuzix in their Star 1200 product, by Olympus, and by Laster Technologies.

Various waveguide techniques have existed for some time. These techniques include diffraction optics, holographic optics, polarized optics, and reflective optics:

- Diffractive waveguide – slanted diffraction grating elements (nanometric 10E-9). Nokia technique now licensed to Vuzix.
- Holographic waveguide – 3 holographic optical elements (HOE) sandwiched together (RGB). Used by Sony and Konica Minolta.
- Polarized waveguide – 6 multilayer coated (25–35) polarized reflectors in glass sandwich. Developed by Lumus.
- Reflective waveguide – A thick light guide with single semi-reflective mirror is used by Epson in their Moverio product. A curved light guide with partial-reflective segmented mirror array to out-couple the light is used by tooz technologies.
- "Clear-Vu" reflective waveguide – thin monolithic molded plastic w/ surface reflectors and conventional coatings developed by Optinvent and used in their ORA product.
- Switchable waveguide – developed by SBG Labs, now known as DigiLens.

== Input devices ==
Input devices that lend themselves to mobility and/or hands-free use are good candidates, for example:

- Touchpad or buttons
- Compatible devices (e.g. smartphones or control unit)
- Speech recognition
- Gesture recognition
- Eye tracking

== Recent developments ==
=== 2012 ===
- On 17 April 2012, Oakley's CEO Colin Baden stated that Oakley has been working on a way to project information directly onto lenses since 1997, and has 600 patents related to the technology, many of which apply to optical specifications.
- On 18 June 2012, Canon announced the MR (Mixed Reality) System which simultaneously merges virtual objects with the real world at full scale and in 3D. Unlike the Google Glass, the MR System is aimed for professional use with a price tag for the headset and accompanying system is $125,000, with $25,000 in expected annual maintenance.

=== 2013 ===
- At Maker Faire 2013, the startup company Technical Illusions unveiled castAR augmented reality glasses which are well equipped for an AR experience: infrared LEDs on the surface detect the motion of an interactive infrared wand, and a set of coils at its base are used to detect RFID chip loaded objects placed on top of it; it uses dual projectors at a framerate of 120 Hz and a retroreflective screen providing a 3D image that can be seen from all directions by the user; a camera sitting on top of the prototype glasses is incorporated for position detection, thus the virtual image changes accordingly as a user walks around the CastAR surface.

=== 2016 ===
- The Latvian-based company NeckTec announced the smart necklace form-factor, transferring the processor and batteries into the necklace, thus making facial frame lightweight and more visually pleasing.

=== 2018 ===
- Intel announces Vaunt, a set of smart glasses that are designed to appear like conventional glasses and are display-only, using retinal projection. The project was later shut down.
- Zeiss and Deutsche Telekom partners up to form tooz technologies GmbH to develop optical elements for smart glass displays.

=== 2019 ===
- Microsoft introduced the HoloLens 2, a self-contained optical see-through HMD using holographic waveguides, with a larger field of view and improved ergonomics over the original model.

=== 2021 ===
- Snap Inc. announced a developer-only generation of Spectacles with dual 3D waveguide displays and a 26.3° diagonal field of view, intended to overlay AR Lenses directly onto the real world.

=== 2022 ===
- Magic Leap 2 debuted with a see-through display and a dynamic dimming system that can globally or locally dim the real-world view to improve virtual image contrast and enable basic occlusion effects.

== Market structure ==
Analytics company IHS has estimated that the shipments of smart glasses may rise from just 50,000 units in 2012 to as high as 6.6 million units in 2016. According to a survey of more than 4,600 U.S. adults conducted by Forrester Research, around 12 percent of respondents are willing to wear Google Glass or other similar device if it offers a service that piques their interest. Business Insider's BI Intelligence expects an annual sales of 21 million Google Glass units by 2018.

According to reliable reports, Samsung and Microsoft are expected to develop their own version of Google Glass within six months with a price range of $200 to $500. Samsung has reportedly bought lenses from Lumus, a company based in Israel. Another source says Microsoft is negotiating with Vuzix.

In 2006, Apple filed patent for its own HMD device.

In July 2013, APX Labs founder Brian Ballard stated that he knows of 25-30 hardware companies who are working on their own versions of smart glasses, some of which APX is working with.

== Comparison of near-eye see-through display technologies ==
Combiner technology	Size	Eye box	FOV	Limits / Requirements	Example
Flat combiner 45 degrees	Thick	Medium	Medium	Traditional design	Vuzix, Google Glass
Curved combiner	Thick	Large	Large	Classical bug-eye design	Many products (see through and occlusion)
Phase conjugate material	Thick	Medium	Medium	Very bulky	OdaLab
Buried Fresnel combiner	Thin	Large	Medium	Parasitic diffraction effects	The Technology Partnership (TTP)
Cascaded prism/mirror combiner	Variable	Medium to Large	Medium	Louver effects	Lumus, Optinvent
Free form TIR combiner	Medium	Large	Medium	Bulky glass combiner	Canon, Verizon & Kopin (see through and occlusion)
Diffractive combiner with EPE	Very thin	Very large	Medium	Haze effects, parasitic effects, difficult to replicate	Nokia / Vuzix
Holographic waveguide combiner	Very thin	Medium to Large in H	Medium	Requires volume holographic materials	Sony
Holographic light guide combiner	Medium	Small in V	Medium	Requires volume holographic materials	Konica Minolta
Combo diffuser/contact lens	Thin (glasses)	Very large	Very large	Requires contact lens + glasses	Innovega & EPFL
Tapered opaque light guide	Medium	Small	Small	Image can be relocated	Olympus

== See also ==
- Epiphany Eyewear
- EyeTap
- Open Cobalt
- Recon Instruments
- SixthSense
- Smartglasses
- Virtual retinal display
