= Everysight =

Everysight Ltd.
- Type: Private company
- Industry: Smartglasses
- Founded: February 25, 2014; 12 years ago
- Headquarters: Haifa, Israel
- Website: https://everysight.com/

Everysight Ltd. is an Israeli technology company established in 2014 as a spinoff of Elbit Systems. Everysight develops smartglasses based on augmented reality technology for the civilian market. The company's main product is Raptor smartglasses.

== History ==
=== Early years ===
Everysight's first generation projection system was developed in 2004. This version was a small micro-HUD, which used a staged beam combiner integrated within a panel window device located in front of the user's eye. This allowed the user to view the surroundings while looking at real-time information, projected from the combiners, and perceived as an augmented reality graphic layer floating in front of the user. An eMagin OLED display component enabled users to view the projected information even in full sunlight.

The display system was connected by cable to a Sony U subnotebook running Windows XP, which interfaced wirelessly with a variety of ANT+ sensors while running custom software designed for cycling and skiing.

=== 2006–2007 – 2nd generation ===
The team developed the second generation of smartglasses based on the free space principle, with an off-axis non-forming exit pupil, whereby the glasses' lenses themselves are used as a beam combiner in such a way that the projected light can return to the user's eye. Other than the lens itself, there is no additional element in front of the eye, preventing sight obstruction and increasing eye safety. Additionally, the lenses featured a spherical structure delivering built-in correction for optical distortions. The optical solution combined the use of a mini OLED display with significantly low power consumption. The optical solution proved to perform with extremely high efficiency while enabling a high-contrast display that remained visible even in full sunlight. The model was powered by a specially adapted, PDA-like computer running Windows CE, which was connected to the glasses by cable and ran various software apps. The computer included a wireless interface, which enabled connection to a cellular network via smartphone, as well as a wide range of sensors (such as GPS, heart rate belt, speed sensor, cadence sensor, etc.).

=== 2008–2010 – 3rd generation ===
The team developed their third generation smartglasses, which included an integrated microcomputer with a graphics processor, line of sight system, camera, audio system and memory storage. The computer was based on dedicated low power Field-Programmable Gate Array (FPGA) hardware that could wirelessly interface with smartphones serving as a gateway to the internet.

=== 2010–2012 – 4th generation ===
The team developed the fourth generation smartglasses that included a patented minimized optical solution also based on the principle of projection from the lens itself. This optical solution enabled significant reduction of the frames in terms of both dimensions and weight. These glasses included aspheric lenses, which are compatible with plastic materials and allow for injection molding. The smaller, redesigned lens had a spherical structure which included built-in correction for optical distortions. This new optical solution was also proved to perform with high optical efficiency, enabling the integration of an OLED display for use and viewing of information outdoors, in full sunlight.

=== 2013–2017 – 5th generation ===
Raptor smartglasses is intended for outdoor athletes (road cyclists and mountain bikers). Raptor smartglasses enable users to see real-time graphic information projected directly from the lens, which appears as an augmented reality layer superimposed over the scene. This information includes physiological data, map navigation, training options, and location and media sharing.

The 5th generation of the smartglasses which included an even smaller, Android OS-based computer incorporated into the glasses, as well as a camera, memory storage, audio system, voice commands, wireless interfaces (Wi-Fi, Bluetooth & ANT+), touchpad, and batteries. These glasses used lenses developed for the fourth generation. As part of the development process, the glasses transitioned to mass production, with injection molding production lines opened for both the plastic lenses and the frames.

== See also ==
- Photomyne
- OverOps
