= Brilliant Labs =

Singapore-based technology company

Brilliant Labs is a Singapore-based technology company that produces open source eyewear featuring artificial intelligence (AI).

Brilliant Labs was founded in 2019 in Hong Kong by Bobak Tavangar, a former Apple program lead. Tavangar said he saw the potential for integrating the capabilities of artificial intelligence into glasses to give consumers "visual superpowers." The goal was to use an open source platform for development that would allow creators to access the company's code and create new apps for devices.

In January 2024, the company introduced Frame, which were glasses that looked similar to those worn by Apple co-founder Steve Jobs. They were designed to be indistinguishable from regular eyeglasses and would be worn by those who wore prescription lenses. The glasses were enabled for audio with a voice assistant called Noa and featured an AI search engine called Perplexity. They came at a time when other companies introduced similar products, like AI Pin from Humane, R1 from Rabbit, or Vision Pro from Apple, and came after other products, like Google Glass or HoloLens from Microsoft did not gain traction. Prior to this, the company offered the Monocle, an augmented reality (AR) lens that attached to traditional glasses, and which also used open source software.

In 2025, the company revealed their second-generation smart-glasses, Halo. These glasses include a camera, microphone, and bone-conduction speakers in a compact wayfarer-style form factor, and incorporate an on-device neural processing unit for AI inference.
