= Epiphany Eyewear =

Brand of smart glasses

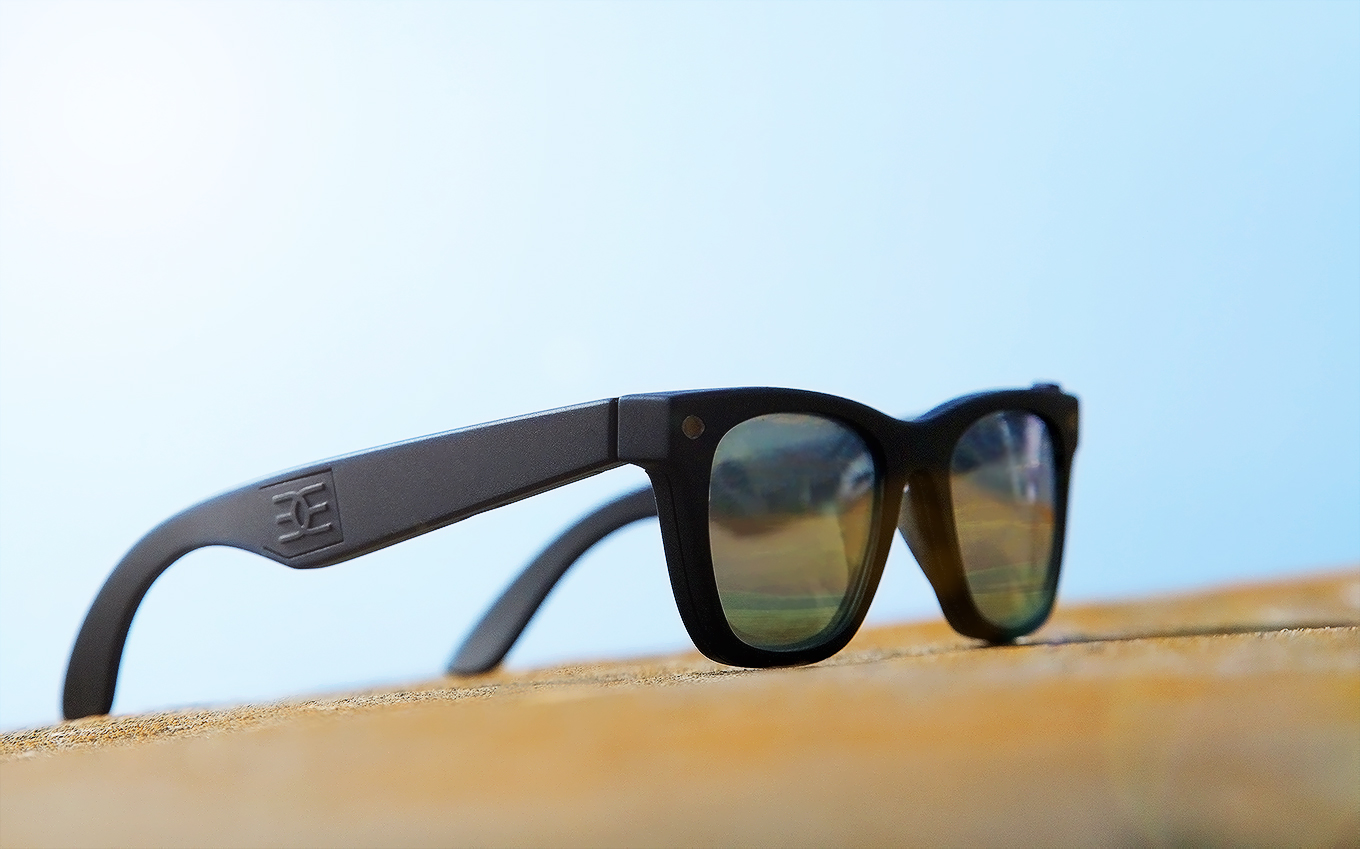
- Developer: Vergence Labs
- Type: Point of View Shot ( POV) Augmented reality (AR), optical head-mounted display (OHMD), Wearable technology, Wearable computer
- Released: Developers (US): May 2011 Consumers: 2013
- Introductory price: 8GB($299 USD), 16GB($399 USD), 32GB($499 USD)
- Storage: 8 GB, 16 GB, or 32 GB
- Connectivity: Wi-Fi, micro USB
- Power: lithium ion battery
- Backward compatibility: Laptop, desktop or Epiphany-capable phone or tablet running the YouGen.TV application

Epiphany Eyewear are smartglasses developed by Vergence Labs. The glasses record video stored within the glasses' hardware for live-stream upload to a computer or social media. The glasses use smartphone technology. The head mounted display is a mobile computer and a high-definition camera. The glasses take photographic images, record or stream video to a smartphone or computer tablet.

The style of the eyewear frames is similar to the basic designer-like frames made famous and worn by Buddy Holly. The multifunction plastic titanium framed glasses are controlled by pressing tactile buttons on the sidebar of the frame to activate the camera or determine the darkness of the sun glass lens. If a prescription eye glass lens is needed, a prescription lens with a Nominal Base Curve of 2 diopters can be installed by an optometrist.

== Hardware ==
The eyewear are point of view shot (POV) video glasses with a computer inside the frames with multicore processing, Wi-Fi and USB connectivity. The computer inside powers a high-definition camera to either take photographs or record motion picture video with sound. The eyewear software and apps allow integration with mobile devices to live-stream recordings and sound to social networks and YouGen.tv. The YouGen.tv website is an app platform provided and developed by Vergence Labs for Epiphany Eyewear users.

The built-in physical computer memory can store 8 GB, 16 GB or up to 32 GB of data. The power is supplied by a rechargeable lithium ion battery. Operations are powered by a tiny USB connection from the eyewear frames to a power source.

== Vergence Labs acquisition ==
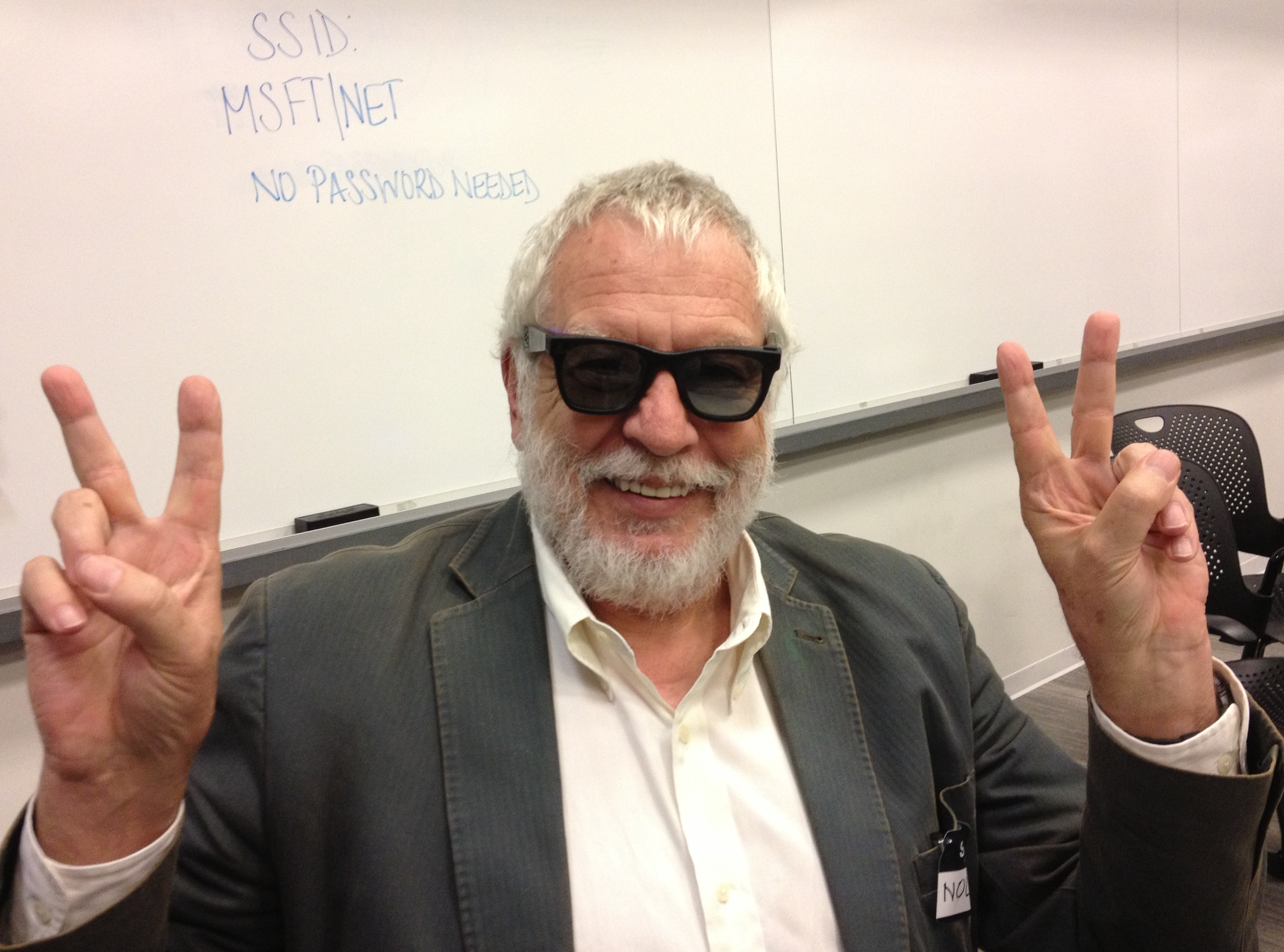
Nolan Bushnell, Founder of Atari

Snap Inc. acquired Vergence Labs, Inc. and its subsidiary Epiphany Eyewear in order to develop a product called Spectacles (product). Vergence Labs, Inc., the stockholders and Vergence Labs’ CEO Erick Miller as the stockholders’ agent, approved the stock purchase agreement and Vergence Labs, Inc. became a wholly owned subsidiary of Snapchat in early 2014.

Epiphany Eyewear were developed by Vergence Labs Co-Founder & CEO Erick Miller; Co-Founder & Chief Science Officer Jon Rodriguez, a former Facebook Engineer Peter Brook, Product Designer David Meisenholder who designed the GL-20 Polaroid video glasses for Lady Gaga, and a former Lenovo Global Product Marketing Manager Cory Grenier.

== See also ==
- Smartglasses
