= Jeri Ellsworth =

American entrepreneur and computer chip designer

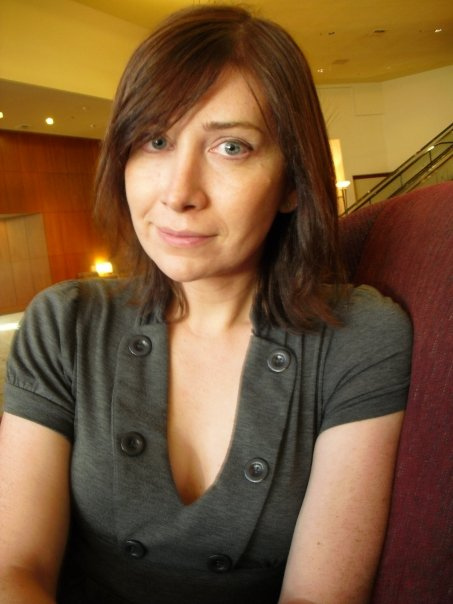
- Ellsworth at California Extreme (Classic Arcade Games Show), 2009
- Born: August 14, 1974 (age 51); Georgia, United States
- Occupation: Entrepreneur; Integrated circuit designer
- Employer: Tilt Five
- Website: jeriellsworth.com

Jeri Janet Ellsworth (born August 14, 1974) is an American entrepreneur, computer chip designer and inventor. She gained fame in 2004 for creating a complete Commodore 64 imitating system on a chip housed within a joystick, called Commodore 30-in-1 Direct to TV. It runs 30 video games from the 1980s, and at peak, sold over 70,000 units in a single day via the QVC shopping channel.

Ellsworth was hired by Valve Corporation to develop augmented reality hardware, but was terminated in 2013. She co-founded castAR to continue the work—with permission—but the company shut down on June 26, 2017 without completing development. She started another company, Tilt Five, to create AR hardware based on the same principles.

Ellsworth has publicly talked about various homebrew projects, such as how to manufacture semiconductor chips at home.

== Early life ==
Ellsworth was born in Georgia and grew up in the towns of Dallas, Oregon and Yamhill, Oregon. Her mother died when she was one. Ellsworth was raised by her father, Jim, a car mechanic and Mobil service station owner.

When she was eight years old, she disassembled her toys to learn how they worked. In response her father stopped buying toys, put an empty box at his work saying "bring your broken electronic gizmos", and every few weeks, gave them to her. She started making simple modifications to them. She persuaded her father to let her use a Commodore 64 computer which had been purchased for her brother. She taught herself to program by reading the manual. She earned spending money working for her father, pumping gas, cleaning wrenches, replacing oil filters, and other "mechanical things".

In high school, she drove dirt track racing cars with her father and began designing new models in his workshop, eventually selling custom race cars. She dropped out of high school to continue the business.

== Computer stores ==
Ellsworth, in front of one of her stores, Computers Made Easy in 2000

In 1995, at the age of 21, Ellsworth tired of race track social atmosphere, so she and a friend started a business assembling and selling computers based around the Intel 486 microprocessor. When she and her partner had a disagreement, Ellsworth opened a separate business in competition. This became a chain of four stores, "Computers Made Easy", selling consumer electronics services and equipment in the Willamette Valley towns of Canby, Monmouth, and Albany, Oregon.

When profit margins shrank, she sold the chain in 2000 and moved to Walla Walla, Washington to attend Walla Walla College, studying circuit design. She left after a year because of a "cultural mismatch". Ellsworth said that questioning professors' answers was frowned upon.

== Hardware design ==
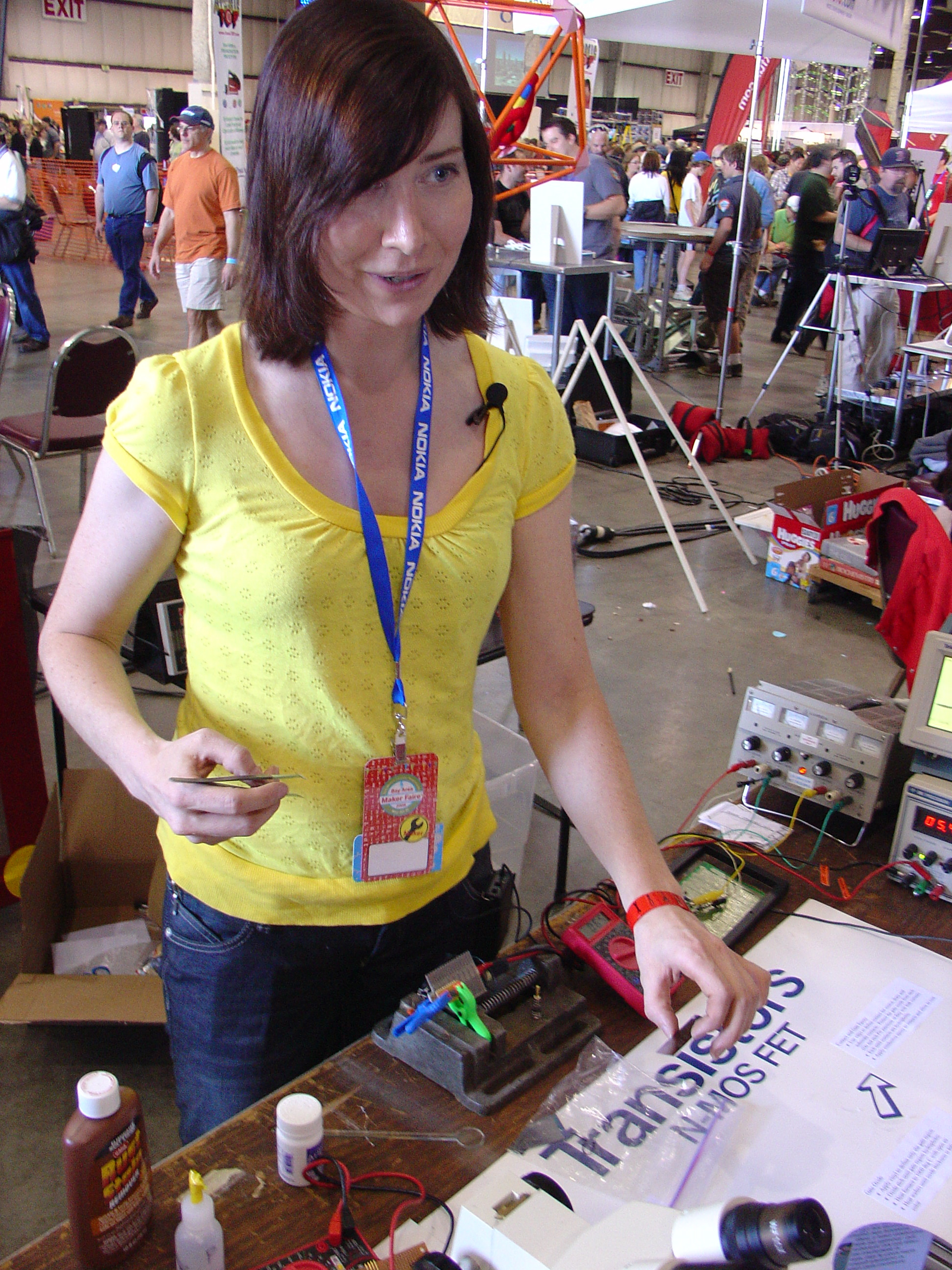
Ellsworth at Bay Area Maker Faire 2009

In 2000, Ellsworth unveiled a prototype video expansion for the Commodore 64 at a Commodore Exposition. Ellsworth then began designing digital circuits that mimicked the behavior of the C64. In 2002, she designed the chip used in the C-One as an enhanced C64 which could also imitate other home computers of the early 1980s, including the VIC-20 and ZX81. She and a fellow developer displayed the C-One at a technology conference, which led to Mammoth Toys, a Division of NSI International, NSI Products (HK) Limited hiring her to design the "computer in a chip" for the C64 Direct-to-TV C64-imitating joystick. She began the project in June 2004 and had the project ready to ship by that Christmas. It sold over a half-million units, in the US, Europe, and elsewhere. She did not receive payment, nor the commission she was owed, but a story in the New York Times brought her to the public eye.

On December 3, 2010 Ellsworth released information on how to build a TSA "naked" scanner using repurposed satellite antenna parts. Ellsworth has worked on numerous subjects as diverse as homemade semiconductors (2009), homemade electroluminescent (EL) displays (2010), EL phosphor manufacture from common ingredients and ways to make transparent EL backplanes and phosphor without using expensive indium-tin-oxide coated glass and hard-to-obtain chemicals.

Ellsworth is a freelance ASIC and FPGA designer.

== Augmented reality ==
In early 2012, Ellsworth and other hardware hackers were hired by Valve to work on gaming hardware. Along with several other Valve employees, Ellsworth was terminated the following year.

On May 18, 2013, Ellsworth announced that she had developed an augmented reality development system named castAR with fellow ex-Valve engineer Rick Johnson, with the blessing of Valve's Gabe Newell, and would be funding it via Kickstarter later in the year. Her start-up company, Technical Illusions, started developing castAR.

Ellsworth later revealed she had been secretly working to make castAR have "true VR and true AR" in addition to the previously announced projected AR capabilities. The castAR Kickstarter, launched on October 14, 2013, reached its goal of $400,000 in 56 hours and finished with $1.05 million, 263% of the original goal. The project didn't deliver the devices and paid back the funds to backers before shutting down the company in 2017.

In September 2019, Ellsworth initiated a Kickstarter for a new device based on the same principles of the castAR, called Tilt Five. This Kickstarter exceeded the previous one, hitting its initial target of $450,000 in 17 hours, and eventually gaining $1,767,301. Initially scheduled to deliver Kickstarter product by June 2020, the manufacturing was delayed by the Covid pandemic, but has continued to sign gaming contracts.

== Public speaking and webcasts ==
Ellsworth was a keynote speaker at the Embedded Systems Conference on May 5, 2011.

From December 2008 until March 2009, Ellsworth hosted a weekly webcast, Fatman and Circuit Girl, together with musician George Sanger. On May 30, 2009, Ellsworth demonstrated her Home Chip Lab at Maker Faire Bay Area 2009.

== Personal life ==
Ellsworth is a pinball aficionado and owns over 80 pinball machines. In 2016, she became a licensed amateur radio operator, holding an Extra Class license with callsign AI6TK.
