= Imran Chaudhri =

British-American designer and inventor

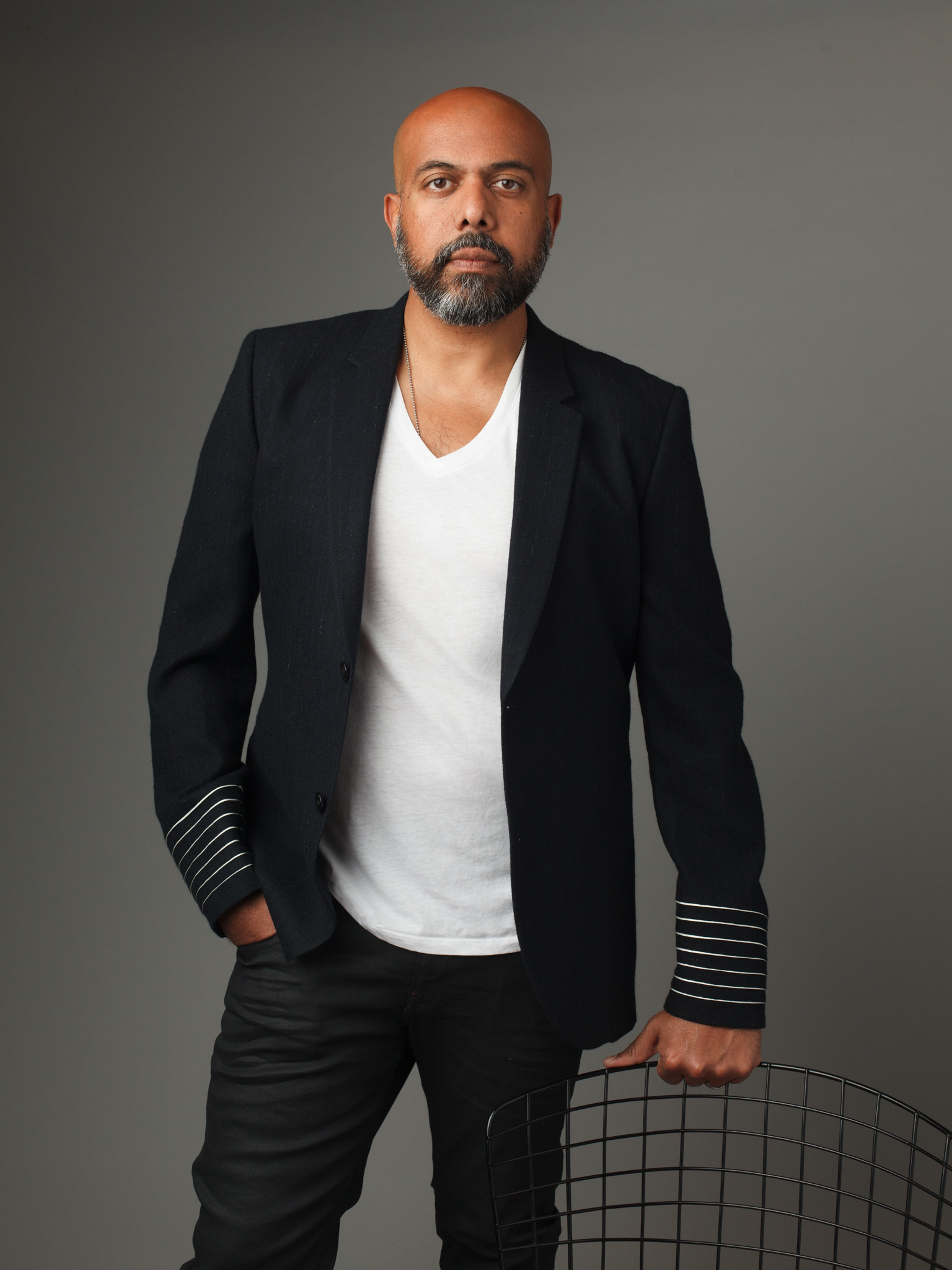
- Chaudhri in 2017
- Born: London, England
- Occupation: Designer
- Known for: Humane Inc

Imran Chaudhri is a designer and founder of Humane Inc., a company created with his wife, Bethany Bongiorno. He created user interface and interaction designs for Apple products from 1995 to 2017.

== Career ==
Chaudhri was part of the design team that made the original iPhone interface. He co-created the iPhone home screen, complete with its rearrangement functionality.

Chaudhri was fired by Apple in 2017, a month before he was expected to leave, after sending a departure email.

He formed his own technology company, Humane with his wife Bethany, who he met while they both were working on the iPad. In 2025, HP acquired most of the Humane company, along with Chaudhri, who will lead a new team to integrate AI features into HP products.
