= Volume hologram =

Volume holograms are holograms where the thickness of the recording material is much larger than the light wavelength used for recording. In this case diffraction of light from the hologram is possible only as Bragg diffraction, i.e., the light has to have the right wavelength (color) and the wave must have the right shape (beam direction, wavefront profile). Volume holograms are also called thick holograms or Bragg holograms.

== Theory ==
Volume holograms were first treated by H. Kogelnik in 1969 by the so-called "coupled-wave theory". For volume phase holograms it is possible to diffract 100% of the incoming reference light into the signal wave, i.e., full diffraction of light can be achieved. Volume absorption holograms show much lower efficiencies. H. Kogelnik provides analytical solutions for transmission as well as for reflection conditions. A good text-book description of the theory of volume holograms can be found in a book from J. Goodman.

== Manufacturing ==
A volume hologram is usually made by exposing a photo-thermo-refractive glass to an interference pattern from an ultraviolet laser. It is also possible to make volume holograms in nonphotosensitive glass by exposing it to femtosecond laser pulses.

== Bragg selectivity ==
In the case of a simple Bragg reflector the wavelength selectivity $\Delta\lambda$ can be estimated by $\Delta\lambda/\lambda \approx \Lambda/L$, where $\lambda$ is the vacuum wavelength of the reading light, $\Lambda$ is the period length of the grating, and $L$ is the thickness of the grating. The assumption is just that the grating is not too strong, i.e., that the full length of the grating is used for light diffraction. Considering that because of the Bragg condition the simple relation $\Lambda = \lambda/(2\Delta n)$ holds, where $\Delta n$ is the modulated refractive index in the material (not the base index) at this wavelength, one sees that for typical values ($\lambda = 500\text{ nm},\ L = 1\text{ mm},\ \Delta n = 0.01$) one gets $\Delta\lambda \approx 12.5\text{ nm}$, showing the extraordinary wavelength selectivity of such volume holograms.

In the case of a simple grating in the transmission geometry the angular selectivity $\Delta\Theta$ can be estimated as well: $\Delta\Theta \approx \Lambda/d$, where $d$ is the thickness of the holographic grating. Here $\Lambda$ is given by $\Lambda = (\lambda/2\sin\Theta$).

Using again typical numbers ($\lambda = 500\text{ nm},\ d = 1\text{ cm},\ \Theta = 45^\circ$), one ends up with $\Delta\Theta \approx 4 \times 10^{-5}\text{ rad} \approx 0.002^\circ$, showing the impressive angular selectivity of volume holograms.

== Applications of volume holograms ==
The Bragg selectivity makes volume holograms very important. Prominent examples are:

- Distributed-feedback lasers (DFB lasers) as well as distributed-Bragg-reflector lasers (DBR lasers), where the wavelength selectivity of volume holograms is used to narrow the spectral emission of semiconductor lasers.
- Holographic memory devices for holographic data storage, where the Bragg selectivity is used to multiplex several holograms in one piece of holographic recording material using effectively the third dimension of the storage material.
- Fiber Bragg gratings that employ volume holographic gratings encrypted into an optical fiber. Wavelength filters are used as an external feedback in particular for semiconductor lasers. Although the idea is similar to that of DBR lasers, these filters are not integrated onto the chip. With the help of such filters also high-power laser diodes become narrow-band and less temperature-sensitive.
- Imaging spectroscopy can be achieved by selecting a single wavelength for each pixel in a full camera field. Volume holograms are used as tunable optical filters to produce monochromatic images, also known as hyperspectral imaging.
- Low-frequency ("THz") Raman spectroscopy.

== See also ==
- Dynamical theory of diffraction
