= Lumus =

Israeli display technology manufacturer

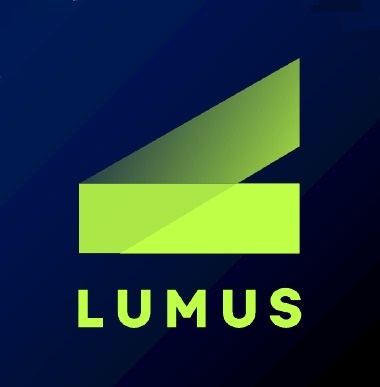
- Website type: Private
- Headquarters: Ness Ziona, {{{location_country}}}
- CEO: Ari Grobman
- Key people: Shlomo Kalish (Chairman of the Board)
- Industry: Near-eye display, Augmented Reality, Consumer Electronics
- Website: lumus.com

Lumus is an Israeli-based company headquartered in Ness Ziona, Israel that creates optical waveguides for head-mounted displays. Founded in 2000, Lumus has developed technology for see-through wearable displays, via its patented Light-guide Optical Element (LOE) platform to market producers of smart glasses and augmented reality eyewear.

== Technology ==
The LOE is the patented optical waveguide that makes use of multiple partial reflectors embedded in a single substrate to reflect a virtual image into the eye of the wearer. Specifically, the image is coupled into the LOE by a "Pod" (micro-display projector) that sits at the edge of the waveguide—in an eyeglass configuration, this is embedded in the temple of the glasses. The image travels through total internal reflection to the multiple array of partial reflectors and are reflected to the eye. While each partial reflector shows only a portion of the image, the optics are such that the wearer sees the combined array and perceives it as a single uniform image projected at infinity. The transparent display enables a virtual image to be seamlessly overlaid over the wearer's real world view. This is especially true when the source image comprises a black background with light color wording or symbology being displayed. Black is essentially see-through color, while lighter colored objects, symbols or characters appear to float in the wearer's line of sight.

Lumus, with the LOE, has a single waveguide that works on all colors. The thickness of their one LOE is similar to the stack of multiple (one per red, green, and blue) thinner waveguides on HoloLens. They simply cut the waveguide's entrance at an angle to get the light to enter (rather than use a color specific diffraction grating), and then they use a series of very specially designed partial mirrors to cause the light to exit.

The company builds reflective waveguides. They rely on microscopic etchings in transparent glass lenses that catch light being projected into their edges.

== Applications ==
- Navigation
- Mobile applications
- Gaming
- Military

== Products ==
In January 2025 Lumus introduced their new 2D geometric waveguide, Z-Lens with both 50 and 30 degrees available.

Using Lumus Optical Engines (OE) or development kits allows smart eyewear manufacturers to maintain their own industrial design and branding.

Lenovo announced at Transform 3.0 at Accelerate convention, that it's using Lumus AR glasses in its ThinkReality A6 headset.
