= Photomyne =

Israeli technology company

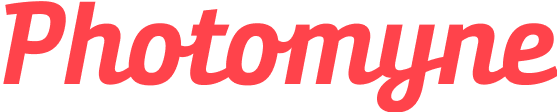
- Type: Public
- Industry: AI, Mobile B2C
- Founded: 2014
- Founder: Nir Tzemah, Yair Segalovitz, Omer Shoor, Natalie Rodrig Verter
- Headquarters: Israel
- Website: photomyne.com

Photomyne Ltd. is a tech company that develops artificial intelligence-driven mobile applications and services focused on the digital preservation of personal memories. Its platform enables users to scan, restore, and organize analog photographs and other visual media, such as slides and film negatives, using a smartphone. Photomyne’s products are designed to help individuals safeguard and share historical and family visual archives, and are available worldwide on both iOS and Android platforms.

== History ==
Photomyne was founded in 2014 by Nir Tzemah, Yair Segalovitz, Omer Shoor, and Natalie Rodrig Verter. The company’s early development focused on enabling smartphones to efficiently capture and digitize multiple printed photographs in a single scan, using automated cropping and enhancement powered by machine learning.

In 2016, The company raised $2.6 million in seed funding to advance its image processing technology and support early global adoption. In 2017, Photomyne won the Visual 1st Best of Show Award at the Visual 1st conference in San Francisco. The company completed a $5 million Series A round in 2018 to deepen its AI research and extend its product line.

In 2021, Photomyne conducted an initial public offering (IPO) on the Tel Aviv Stock Exchange. In 2023, Photomyne won the Grand Award at the Asia Smart App Awards 2022/2023, along with the Gold Award in the “Lifestyle & Entertainment” category. In 2024, the company was included in Andreessen Horowitz’s (a16z) list of the top 50 most popular consumer generative AI products. Since 2024, Photomyne is featured under the “Works with Google Photos” page and has a dedicated page highlighting its scanning and digitization capabilities.

== Products ==
=== Photo Scan By Photomyne App ===
The Photomyne Photo Scan app is the company’s flagship product, designed to help users digitize and preserve printed photographs. The app enables multi-photo scanning, automated cropping, and image enhancement, and adding metadata such as names, dates, locations, and optional audio recordings. It also offers cloud backup, saving to device storage, and sharing through email and other platforms.

=== SlideScan ===
SlideScan is an application for converting photographic slides into digital images using AI-based detection and color restoration techniques to preserve the appearance of the original material.

=== FilmBox ===
FilmBox enables users to scan film negatives and employs AI to invert and enhance them into digital photographs.

== Activities ==
Photomyne's apps are available in multiple languages, including Western European languages, Chinese, Japanese, Thai, Korean, Arabic, and more.

=== Technology ===
Photomyne’s applications employ machine learning and AI technology to automate the digitization of analog photographs and related visual media. The software is designed to run on the device, in real time, identify and separate multiple printed photos captured in a single frame, followed by automated cropping and perspective correction to produce accurate digital reproductions.

To support long-term preservation of personal and family visual history, Photomyne’s technology includes image-enhancement capabilities such as sharpening and color restoration of aged or faded prints. The platform also offers AI-based colorization of black-and-white photos.

Digitized materials can be backed up, organized, and accessed through Photomyne’s cloud services, allowing users to maintain searchable, shareable digital archives of their analog photo collections.

Photomyne holds several U.S. patents related to image processing and computer-vision techniques used in its applications, including patents 9,754,163, 9,928,418, 10,198,629, and 10,452,905.

== Legal matters ==
=== Voluntary Dismissal of 2024 Class Action Lawsuit ===
On July 17, 2024, a class action lawsuit was filed in Illinois alleging that Photomyne violated the Illinois' Biometric Information Privacy Act (BIPA). A class action alleging Photomyne violated Illinois’s BIPA was filed July 17, 2024 (Planos v. Photomyne, No. 1:24-cv-06048) and was voluntarily dismissed on Sept. 27, 2024 (case terminated Sept. 30, 2024).
