= Erick Miller =

American entrepreneur (born 1977)

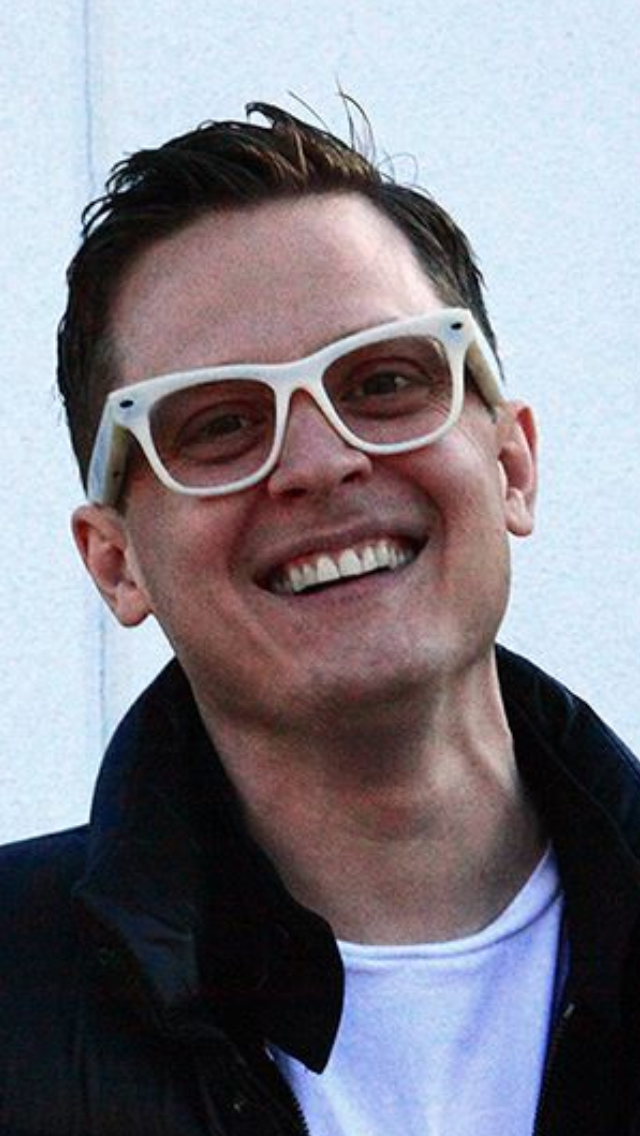
- Erick Miller wearing Epiphany Eyewear
- Born: January 1, 1977 (age 49); California, United States
- Education: UCLA Anderson School of Management
- Occupation: Entrepreneur
- Known for: Founder & CEO Vergence Labs

Erick Miller is an American entrepreneur and investor who began his career building startups during the dot-com bubble of the late 1990s in San Francisco, California. Miller is the founding managing director of Hyperspeed Ventures.

He founded and was the CEO of Vergence Labs, a manufacturer of wearable computer enabled video streaming glasses under the brand name Epiphany Eyewear as well as augmented reality (AR) and virtual reality (VR) eyewear.

== Career ==
Miller began his career with a dot-com startup that he helped build and that was acquired in 2001. He transitioned into the 3D computer animation industry as he completed an undergraduate degree in the field. Miller later received an MBA from UCLA Anderson School of Management and another Master's in Business from the National University of Singapore in 2011.

In 2010, Miller began working on prototypes and patents for what would become in 2011 the company Vergence Labs with a founding team largely from Stanford University. Although Vergence Labs' first major release was the Epiphany Eyewear smart glasses, early in the company's history prototypes for both virtual reality and augmented reality products were developed as the vision and mission of the company. The Epiphany Eyewear POV social video smart glasses were designed with an embedded camera and computer system within frames similar in style to the wayfarer design. The design and development of Epiphany Eyewear pre-dated the start of Google Glass by about two years. In early 2014 Epiphany Eyewear began shipping to customers.

On November 24, 2014, a hacker group identified itself by the name "Guardians of Peace" (GOP) leaked and released confidential information from the film studio Sony Pictures Entertainment. Aside from major exposure of Sony Pictures business and employee data, information about the confidential acquisition of Miller's Company Vergence Labs' Epiphany Eyewear by Snapchat was revealed. The acquisition of Vergence Labs became public solely as the result of 2014's hack of Sony, including the inbox of Sony Pictures chairman Michael Lynton, a Snapchat board member.

Following the acquisition, Miller created the venture-capital and investment firm Hyperspeed Ventures in 2014. Miller announced the new venture at Wearable World Congress where he spoke about the future of wearables with augmented reality, virtual reality and artificial intelligence. During the Wearable World Congress fireside chat, Miller spoke about his vision for the future of the wearable technology industry; although he refused to discuss reports of Vergence Labs being acquired by Snapchat. At Hyperspeed Ventures, Miller has invested in early-stage technology startups including investments in genetic editing and quantum computing technology companies.

Miller is also a published author, speaker and artist who has worked on feature films and spoken at SIGGRAPH and SXSW. His former employers include Digital Domain of Venice, California, Sony Pictures Imageworks of Culver City, California and Walt Disney Animation Studios of Burbank, California. While at these firms Miller developed technologies for motion picture visuals and digital film making.

== Published works ==
- Miller, Erick (2006). Maya Techniques: Hyper-Real Creature Creation. Alias Learning Tools. Wiley. ISBN 978-1897177044.
- Miller, Erick; Thuriot, Paul; Unay, Jeff; Guindon, Marc-André (5 May 2008). Maya Hyper-Realistic Creature Creation, with DVD. Sybex. ISBN 978-1897177488.

== Patents ==
- "Musculo-skeletal shape skinning", granted June 4, 2012
- "Indirect Binding With Segmented Thin Layers to Provide Shape-Preserving Deformations in Computer Animation", granted November 4, 2009

== Filmography ==
While working in the film industry as a technical director and/or director of technology, Miller worked on the feature films 300, Spider-Man 3, X-Men: The Last Stand, Fantastic Four: Rise of the Silver Surfer, I, Robot, The Day After Tomorrow, Surfs Up, and Bolt.
