= CastAR =

American technology company

castAR
- Type: Startup company
- Industry: Technology, Augmented reality, Virtual reality
- Founded: Woodinville, Washington, Washington (March 2013)
- Founder: Jeri Ellsworth and Rick Johnson
- Defunct: June 26, 2017
- Fate: Closed due to layoffs
- Headquarters: Palo Alto, California, United States
- Key people: Jeri Ellsworth, president and co-founder Rick Johnson, co-founder Steve Parkis, CEO
- Products: castAR
- Number of employees: 70+
- Website: castar.com

castAR (formerly Technical Illusions) was a Palo Alto–based technology startup company founded in March 2013 by Jeri Ellsworth and Rick Johnson. Its first product was to be the castAR, a pair of augmented reality and virtual reality glasses. castAR was a founding member of the nonprofit Immersive Technology Alliance.

== History ==
castAR was founded by two former Valve employees; the castAR glasses were born out of work that started inside Valve. While still at Valve, their team had spent over a year working on the project. They obtained legal ownership of their work after their departure.

In August 2015, Playground Global funded $15 million into castAR to build its product and create augmented-reality experiences. In August 2016, Darrell Rodriguez, former President of LucasArts, joined as the new CEO. In addition, Steve Parkis became President and COO, after leading teams at The Walt Disney Company and Zynga. In September 2016, they opened castAR Salt Lake City, a new development studio formed from a team hired out of the former Avalanche Software, which worked on the Disney Infinity series.

In October 2016, they announced the acquisition of Eat Sleep Play, the developer best known for Twisted Metal, also in Salt Lake City, UT.

In December 2016, Parkis, who had been President and COO, was named CEO to replace Rodriguez.

In June 2017, it was reported by Polygon that CastAR was shutting down, laying off 70 employees. A core group of administrators was expected to remain, to sell off the company's technology.

In September 2019 Jeri Ellsworth initiated a Kickstarter for a new device based on the same principles called Tilt Five. The company uses CastAR technology acquired from the former startup and is founded by CastAR alumni Jeri Ellsworth, Amy Herndon, Jamie Gennis, and Anthony Aquilio

== castAR ==
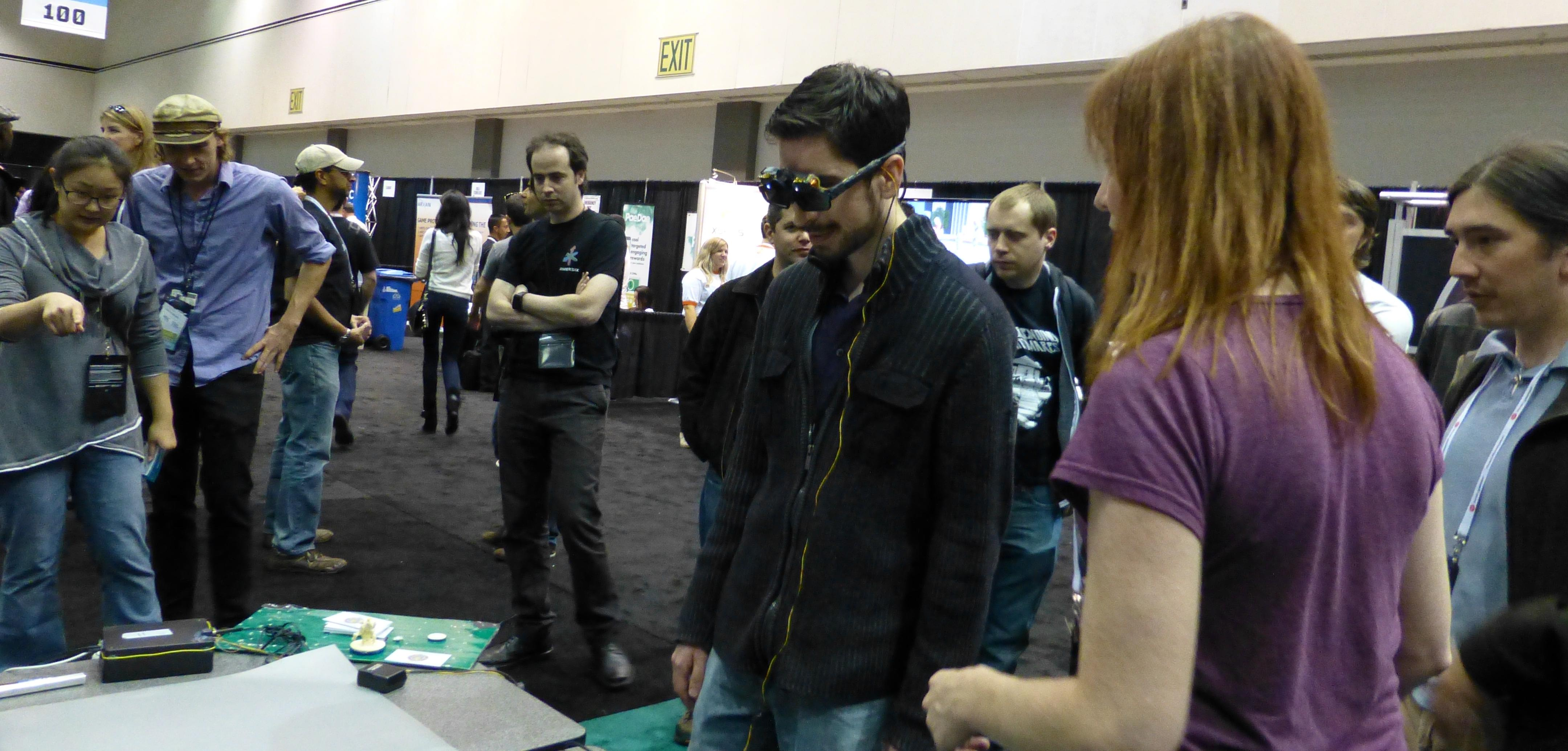
Ellsworth explains castAR to GDC Next 2013 attendees

The castAR glasses combine elements of augmented reality and virtual reality. After winning Educator's and Editor's Choice ribbons at the 2013 Bay Area Maker Faire, the castAR project was successfully crowdfunded via Kickstarter. castAR surpassed its funding goal two days after the project went live, and raised over $1 million on a $400,000 goal. castAR creates transparent stereoscopic images unique to each user by sending an image from tiny projectors on the glasses into the user's surroundings using a technology that Technical Illusions called "Projected Reality". The image bounces off a retro-reflective surface back to the wearer's eyes. castAR can also be used for virtual reality purposes, using its VR clip-on. Before the time of the 2017 company shutdown all Kickstarter funds had been paid back to the original backers. Along with the repayment, a coupon for a free set of the production AR glasses was given to each backer. This happened at the time of the 2015 Playground Global investment.

== See also ==
- Augmented reality
- Display technology
- Smartglasses
