= Humane Inc. =

American technology company

- Type: Private
- Founded: 2018; 8 years ago
- Founder: Imran Chaudhri; Bethany Bongiorno
- Defunct: February 2025; 1 year ago
- Fate: Acquired by HP
- Successor: HP IQ
- Headquarters: San Francisco, California, US
- Products: AI Pin (discontinued)
- Number of employees: 200 (2023)
- Website: humane.com (now offline)

Humane Inc. (stylized as hu.ma.ne) was an American consumer electronics company founded in 2018 by Imran Chaudhri and Bethany Bongiorno. The company designed and developed the AI Pin, a wearable voice-operated virtual assistant device, which started shipping in April 2024 but received poor reviews.

== History ==
Humane was founded by Imran Chaudhri and Bethany Bongiorno in 2018; the couple previously worked at Apple Inc. The startup emerged from stealth mode in 2021. By November 2023, the company had raised $230 million, with notable investors such as Marc Benioff, Sam Altman, Tiger Global, Solstice, SoftBank, Qualcomm, Microsoft, LG, Volvo, and Salesforce. Microsoft and OpenAI also announced partnerships with Humane. Some 200 people were hired to work for the company, with 40% of them having spent time working at Apple Inc. The company stated that it has raised $100 million in both of its Series B and C rounds.

In January 2024, the company laid off 4% of its staff (10 employees). On May 22, 2024, Bloomberg reported news that Humane was seeking a buyer for its business, initially considering offers in the $750 million to $1 billion range. The New York Times reported that Humane had been in talks with HP. In February 2025, it was announced that HP would acquire most of Humane Inc. for $116 million. The deal includes the majority of Humane's employees, software platform, and intellectual property, including the AI Pin's CosmOS operating system and over 300 patents and patent applications, but excludes the AI Pin device business itself, which will be discontinued. Humane’s team, including founders Imran Chaudhri and Bethany Bongiorno, will join HP to help integrate AI into HP’s products on the newly formed HP IQ team.

=== Design ===
The AI Pin is a wearable device consisting of two separate parts—the front processing units and the rear battery. These parts are meant to be attached magnetically, sandwiching the user's clothing at chest level. It is a voice-activated AI assistant and cellular phone, equipped with a camera, speaker, motion sensors, and green monochrome 720p "Laser Ink" projector screen that motion detects the user's hand to project onto, indicated by a green light. The user mostly interacts with the device through a touchpad across most of its face and hand gestures in the air while the projection screen is active; the touchpad has to be tapped for it to listen for voice prompts. The AI and cloud storage features require a $24 monthly subscription. The device's only supported music streaming service is Tidal. Its operating system, CosmOS, is a custom Android distribution. The goal of the Pin's design was to "make [the user] spend less time on [their] phone."

Chaudhri revealed the device and demonstrated its features during a TED Talk in May 2023, and it was later showcased at Paris Fashion Week in September. Humane announced the device's name in July 2023. It was formally announced on November 9, 2023, and sales started one week later at a price of $699. The AI Pin was featured by Time in its Best 200 Inventions of 2023, which was published before the product was released and without the magazine being provided a review unit for testing. Time's co-chairs, Marc and Lynne Benioff, are investors in Humane.

The device began shipping in April 2024. Despite concerns raised by employees, Humane never hired a head of marketing. The company had hoped for 100,000 sales by the end of the year, but until August only shipped 10,000 units. It was reported that between May and August, more AI Pins were returned than purchased. On October 23, 2024, Humane reduced the price of the AI Pin to $499 (excluding any charging case or spare battery). On October 31, 2024, the US Consumer Product Safety Commission recalled Humane's Charge Case Accessory due to a potential fire hazard posed by its lithium polymer battery.

According to news reports, employees had raised concerns about the viability and functionality of the device during the development phase, but these concerns were dismissed. The New York Times's report that included interviews of 23 current and former employees, advisers, and investors pointed to Humane founders overlooking criticisms. At least one senior software engineer was fired after asking if the device would be ready for launch in time, and the firing was attributed to a violation of company policy "by talking negatively about Humane". Chaudhri and Bongiorno reportedly "preferred positivity over criticism", leading some employees to leave the company out of frustration that their feedback was not being heard.

In February 2025, Humane announced it had stopped selling the AI Pin and existing devices would no longer connect to the company’s servers after 12:00 AM San Francisco time on February 28. Following this, the device became virtually unusable and all consumer data on the company's servers was deleted. Humane offered a refund for the products that were shipped on or after November 15, 2024, and stated that they encourage users to recycle the AI Pin through an e-waste recycling program.

==== Reception ====
The AI Pin has received generally negative reviews, praising its exterior design but criticizing its limited battery life and poor thermal control, and questioning the usefulness of many of its features. The New York Times reported that due to overheating problems, Humane executives would use ice packs to chill the AI Pin before previewing it to investors or partners. The author of the newspaper's Tech Fix column stated that the device had "glaring flaws" and was often "wrong, unhelpful or inefficient". The Verge wrote, "After many days of testing, the one and only thing I can truly rely on the AI Pin to do is tell me the time." Inverse stated that it "is slow to answer even basic questions." Fast Company noted that "Almost everything about the pin was a UX disaster for reviewers."

Tech YouTuber Marques Brownlee titled his review video, one of the more famous reactions of a reviewer, "The Worst Product I've Ever Reviewed... For Now". The AI Pin has been compared to smartphones in terms of its usage in daily life. In response to the criticism, lead engineer Ken Kocienda said that he used the product "all the time" but did find it "frustrating sometimes" in the same way as a laptop or smartphone. Due to the heating problem, Humane has also stated that the projector was intended to be used for no longer than nine minutes.

== See also ==
- Quantified self
- Rabbit r1
