= Rabbit r1 =

AI-based personal assistant device

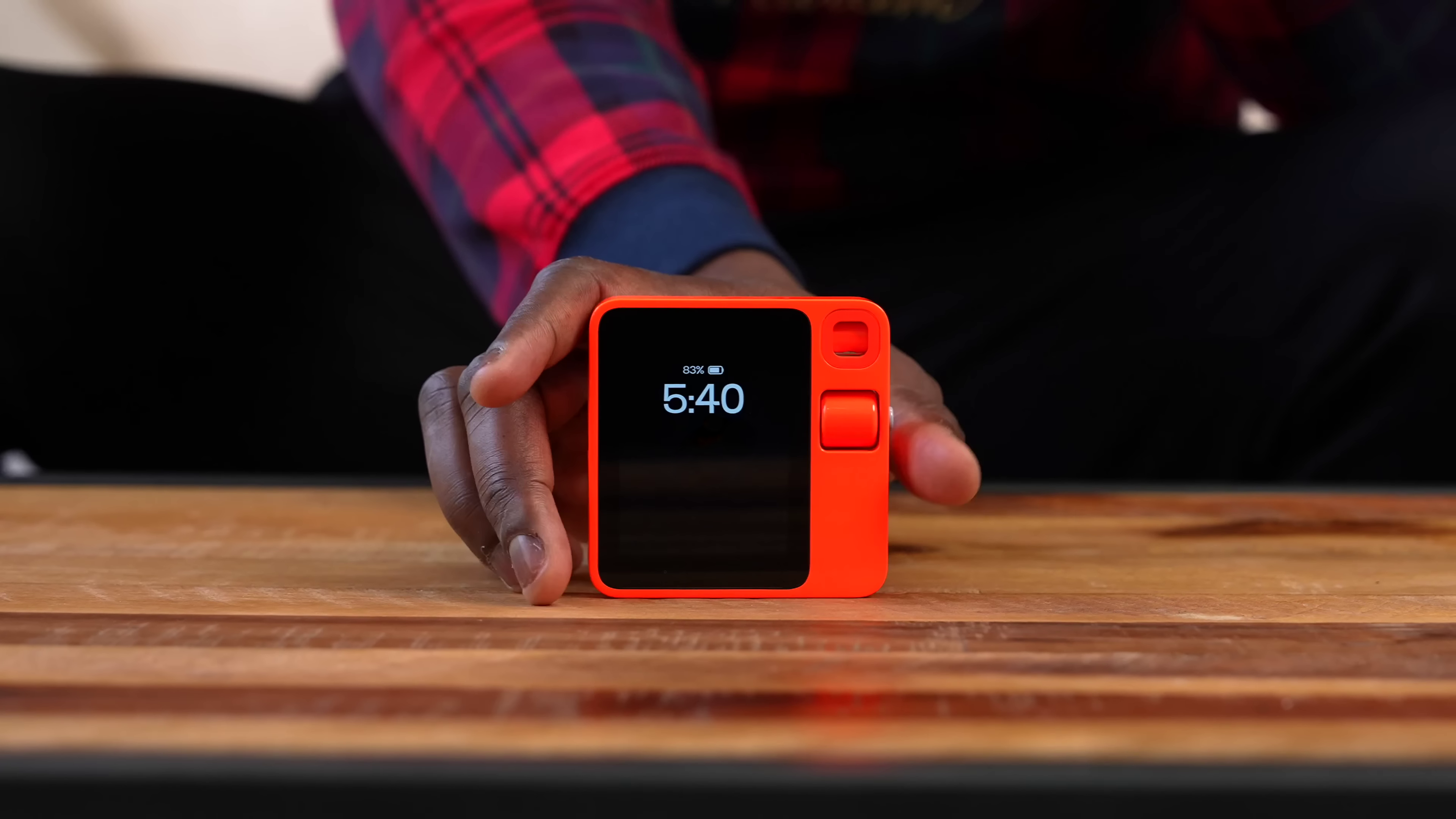
- Developer: Rabbit Inc
- Type: AI personal assistant device
- Released: 9 January 2024
- Operating system: rabbitOS, based on Android Open Source Project
- Website: rabbit.tech

The Rabbit r1 is an artificial intelligence personal assistant device developed by the American technology startup Rabbit Inc and co-designed by Teenage Engineering. It was announced at the 2024 Consumer Electronics Show as a handheld device intended to perform digital tasks through voice commands, touch interaction, and web-based AI agents.

The r1 was marketed around Rabbit's concept of a "large action model" (LAM), which the company described as software able to operate websites and services on behalf of users. The device runs rabbitOS, an operating system based on the Android Open Source Project. Its services have included AI search, image recognition, voice interaction, music playback, rideshare and food-ordering integrations, and later experimental web-agent features such as LAM Playground and teach mode.

Rabbit continued to issue software updates after launch, including rabbitOS 2 in September 2025, which introduced a redesigned card-based interface, gesture navigation, and a "creations" feature for generating small software tools and experiences on the device.

Rabbit Inc was founded by Jesse Lyu.

== Hardware ==
- Display: A 2.88-inch touchscreen for interactive user input.
- Input: push-to-talk button to activate voice commands; scroll wheel; Gyroscope; Magnetometer; Accelerometer; GPS.
- Camera: 8 MP single camera, with a resolution of 3264x2448, allowing for the connected external AI to use computer vision.
- Audio: Equipped with a speaker and dual microphones for audio interaction.
- Connectivity: Supports Wi-Fi and cellular connections via a SIM card slot to access internet services.
- Processor: Runs on a 2.3GHz MediaTek Helio P35 processor.
- Memory: Contains 4GB of RAM for operational tasks.
- Storage: Offers 128GB of internal storage for data.
- Ports: Utilizes a USB-C port for charging and data connections.

== Software ==
The Rabbit r1 runs rabbitOS, which is based on the Android Open Source Project (AOSP), specifically Android 13.

Rabbit described the r1 as using a large action model (LAM), a type of AI agent intended to perform tasks across software interfaces rather than only answer questions. At launch, the device supported a limited set of services, including AI search, vision features, music playback, and some third-party integrations. Perplexity.ai was one of the AI services used to answer user queries.

In 2024, Rabbit released several software updates that added features and attempted to address early criticism of the device. In July 2024, the company launched "beta rabbit", an advanced search and conversation mode for more complex queries. In October 2024, Rabbit released LAM Playground, a web-based agent feature intended to let the r1 operate websites on behalf of users.

In November 2024, Rabbit introduced a beta "teach mode", which allowed users to demonstrate web-based tasks in the Rabbithole web portal and later ask the r1 to repeat them. The company described teach mode as experimental, and warned users that results could be unpredictable and that CAPTCHA-protected sites could cause problems.

Rabbit released rabbitOS 2 in September 2025. The update redesigned the interface around a card-based layout, added additional touchscreen gestures, and introduced "creations", a feature that lets users generate simple software tools, games, and interfaces through natural-language prompts.

== Reception ==
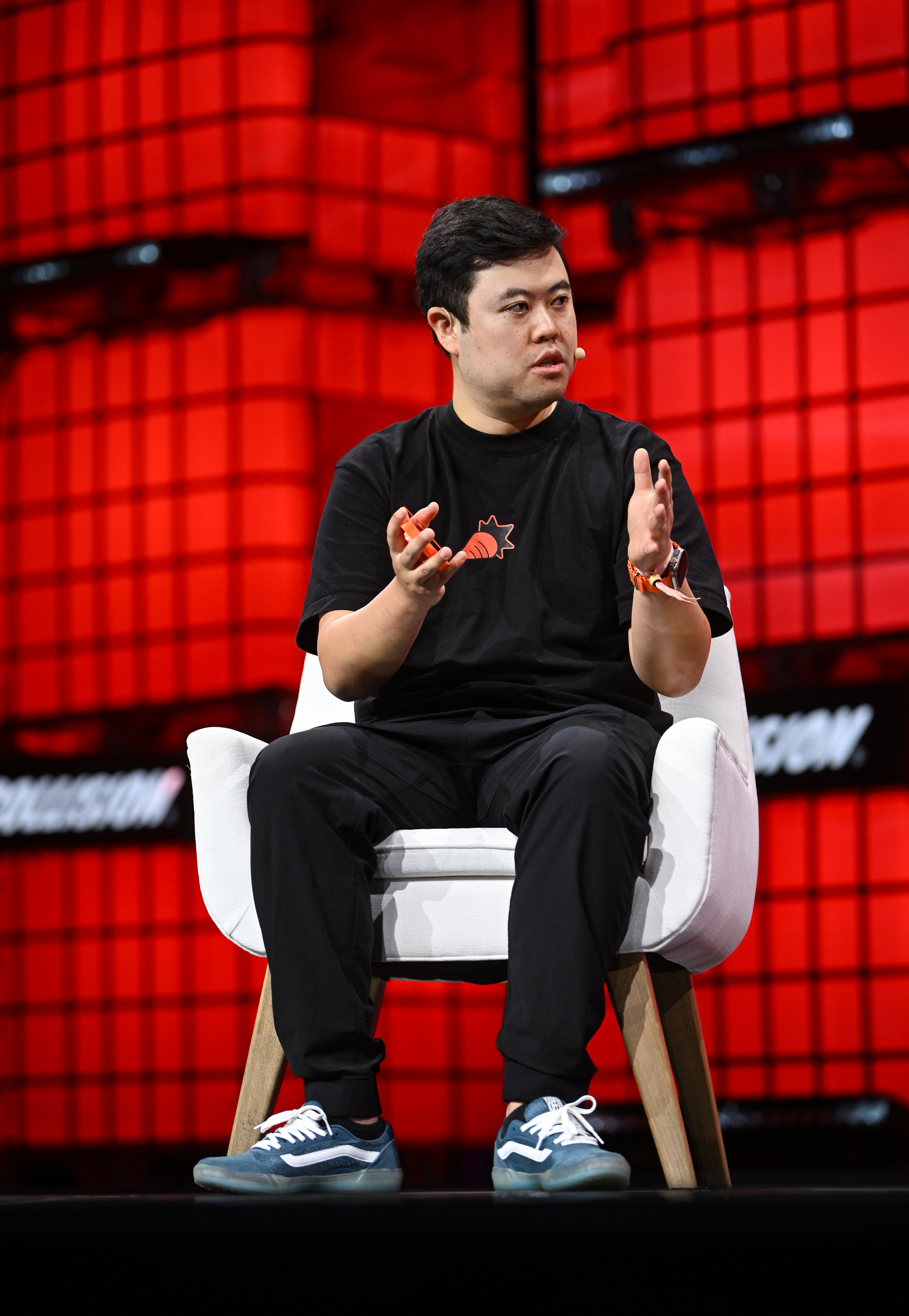
Jesse Lyu, CEO and founder, at Collision 2024 by Web Summit in Toronto

=== Funding ===
Rabbit raised $20 million in funding from Khosla Ventures, Synergis Capital and Kakao Investment in October 2023. The company announced an additional $10 million in funding in December 2023.

=== Sales ===
Following its announcement at the 2024 Consumer Electronics Show, 130,000 units were sold. On August 13, 2024, Rabbit announced that sales of r1 had expanded to the entire European Union (except Malta) and the United Kingdom. On August 21, 2024, sales of r1 expanded to Singapore.

=== Reviews ===
The r1 was met with strong criticism immediately after Rabbit began shipping the device. Some reviews questioned what the device was able to do that a smartphone could not, while comparing it to the similar Humane Ai Pin. Android Authority's Mishaal Rahman managed to install Rabbit r1's software on a Pixel 6a smartphone, after a tipster shared an APK file. The Verge echoed the claims made by Rahman. In response, Lyu published statements confirming its use of Android, but denying that the r1 is an Android app.

Shortly after the launch of r1, Rabbit began a weekly cadence of software updates to address much of the criticism from the early reviews, including "battery and GPS performance, time zone selection, and more". Digital Trends said the Magic Camera feature "takes the most mundane, ordinary, and badly composed photos and makes something fun and eye-catching from them." Mashable said the "beta rabbit" feature "makes Rabbit R1 more conversational and intelligent".

Later coverage noted that Rabbit continued to update the r1 after its poorly received launch. The Verge reported in September 2024 that about 5,000 of roughly 100,000 purchasers were using the device at any given moment, citing Lyu, and described the product as having launched before it was ready. In 2025, coverage of rabbitOS 2 described the update as an attempt to reset the device's software experience after the criticism of its original release.

== Controversies ==
=== GAMA project ===
Rabbit Inc has garnered attention due to allegations surrounding its funding and the company's past projects. The company came under scrutiny when Stephen Findeisen, known as Coffeezilla on YouTube, published a video in May 2024, alleging that Rabbit Incorporation was "built on a scam". Rabbit Incorporation, initially named Cyber Manufacturing Co, rebranded just two months before launching the Rabbit R1. The company, under its former name, raised $6 million in November 2021 for a project called GAMA, described as a "Next Generation NFT Project." Jesse Lyu, the CEO of Rabbit Incorporation, referred to GAMA as a "fun little project."

Coffeezilla, who investigates influencer scams, highlighted old Clubhouse recordings of Jesse Lyu discussing the GAMA project. In these recordings, Lyu emphasized the substantial funding behind GAMA and its potential to be a revolutionary, carbon-negative cryptocurrency. Coffeezilla questioned the whereabouts of the funds raised for GAMA, estimating that approximately $1 million in refunds to investors remained unresolved. He suggested that the rebranding to Rabbit Incorporation and the shift to developing the Rabbit R1 were attempts to divert from the GAMA project's issues.

In response to Coffeezilla's inquiries, Rabbit Incorporation stated that the $6 million raised was used for the GAMA project. The company said that NFTs cannot be refunded unless the owner agrees to "burn" them on the blockchain. Rabbit Incorporation also said that the GAMA project was open-sourced and returned to the community, aligning with community feedback. They also mentioned that efforts to buy back NFTs were made to counteract malicious trading and maintain market stability.

=== Security ===
In June 2024, Engadget reported that the Rabbitude team, a community reverse engineering project, had gained access to the r1's codebase revealing that r1's software contained several hardcoded API keys in its code for ElevenLabs, Microsoft Azure, Yelp, and Google Maps, potentially allowing unauthorized access to r1 responses, including those containing the users' personal information. For a short time, Rabbit immediately began revoking and rotating those secrets and confirmed that the code was leaked by an employee who had "been terminated and remains under investigation".

In July 2024, the company revealed that all user chats and device pairing data were logged on the r1 with no ability to delete them. This meant that lost or stolen devices could be used to extract user data. The company stated that it addressed the issue by introducing a factory reset option and limited the data stored on the r1, as well as preventing paired devices from reading data.

== See also ==
- Humane Inc. – maker of the AI Pin consumer artificial intelligence device
