= Lucien Engelen =

CEO

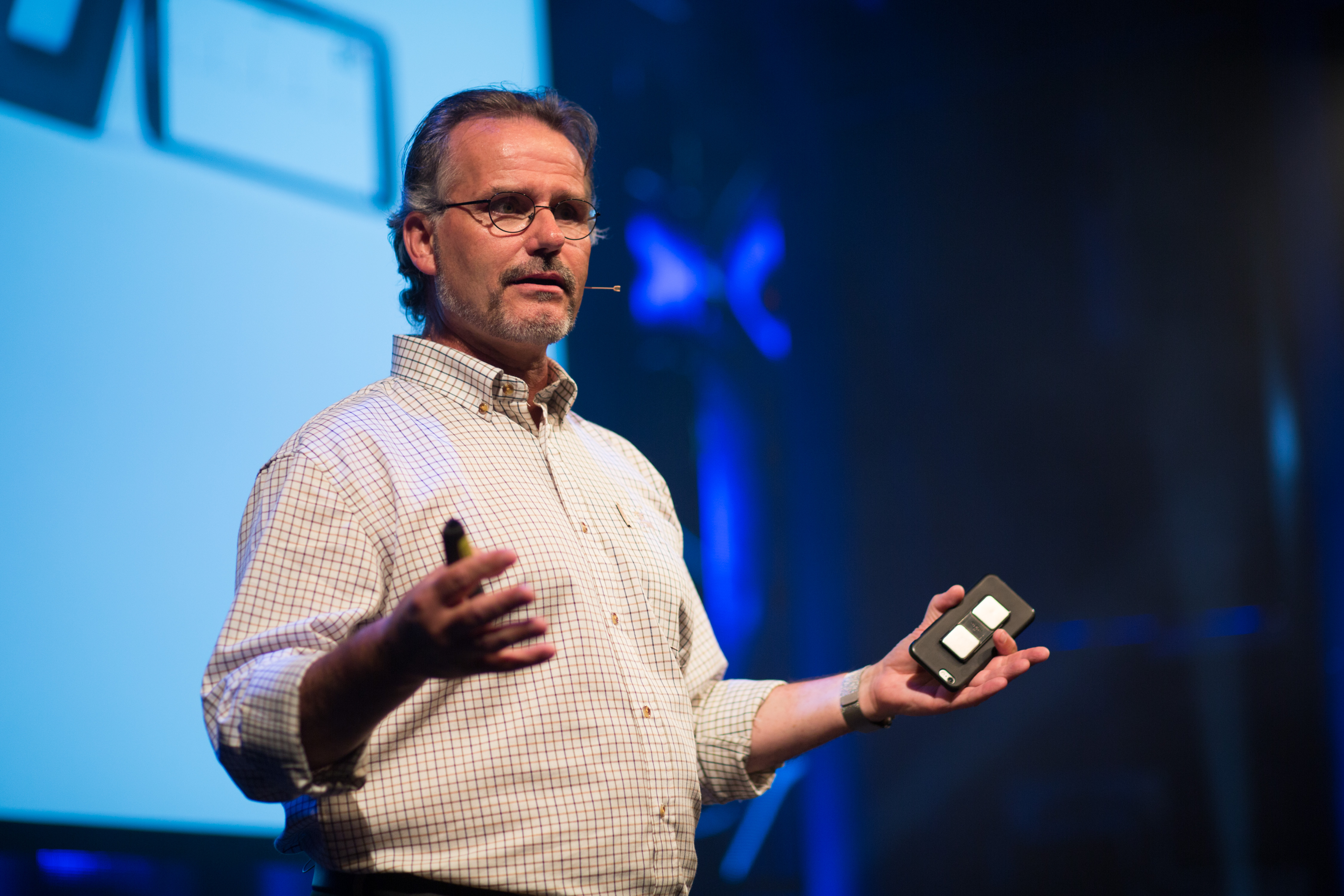
Lucien Engelen in 2016

Lucien Engelen (born Lambertus Johannes Lucia Pierre Gerard; 2 July 1962) is the CEO of Transform.health, Edge Fellow Center for the Edge Deloitte, and a LinkedIn influencer.

== Biography ==
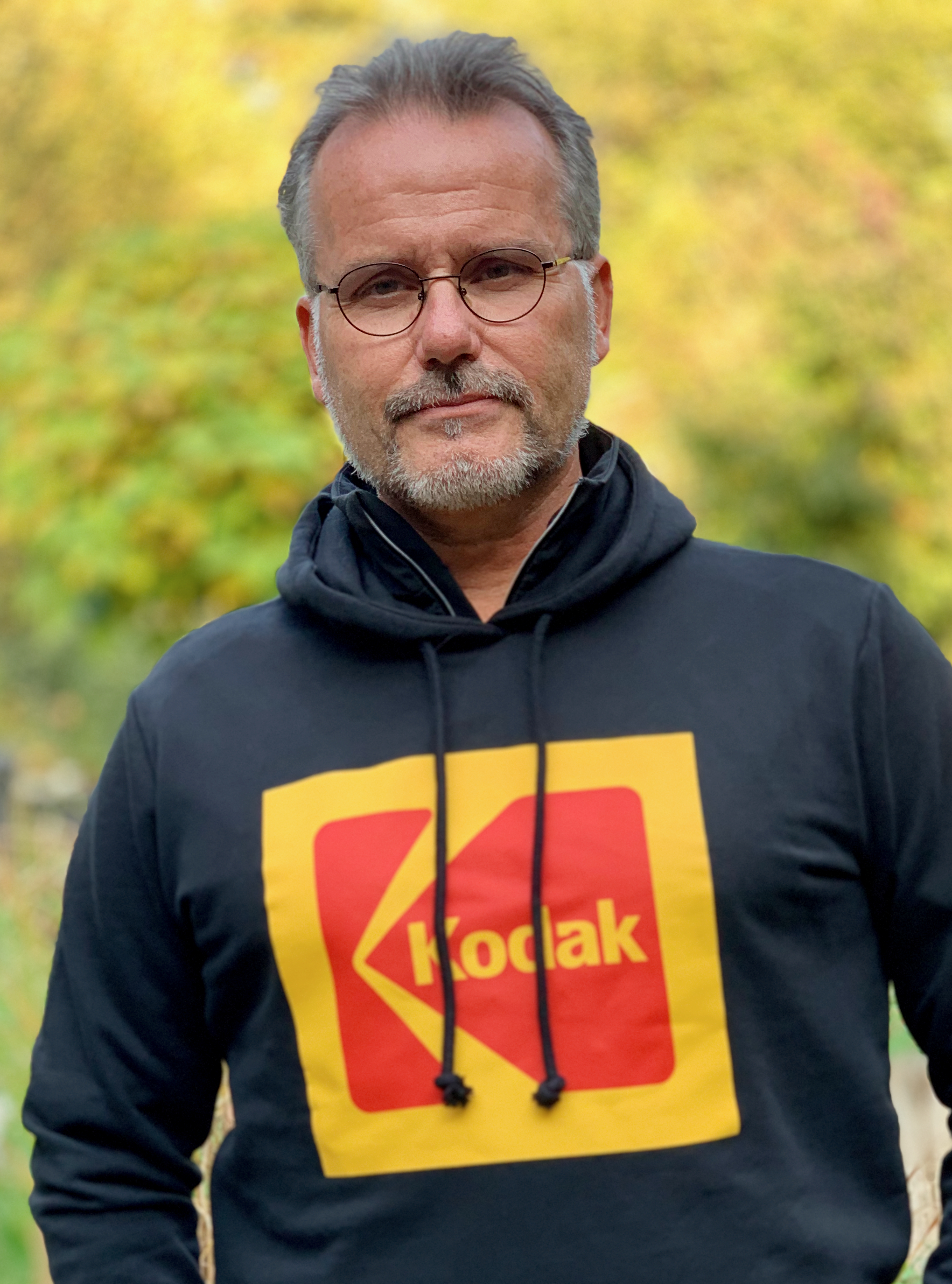
Engelen in one of his favourite hoodies, tongue in cheek to innovation

Lucien Engelen has worked at Radboud University Nijmegen Medical Centre since 2007 as Head of the Regional Emergency Healthcare Network. He is the founder and director of the Radboudumc REshape Innovation Center 2010-2018. He left Radboudumc as of December 2018. and via his company Transform.health he became one of the Edge Fellows at Deloitte Center for the Edge (part-time, not employed, independent non-commercial advisory role to Deloitte). He is an international speaker on healthcare innovation and as of December 2020 joined Erasmus University Medical Center Rotterdam to assist in their innovation ambition to become a 'technical University Medical Center' in collaboration with Erasmus University and Technical University Delft.

He acts as faculty of the healthcare track Exponential Medicine at Singularity University in Silicon Valley since 2011. In 2016, he was selected to join the core faculty of SingularityU The Netherlands due to his work regarding technology and patient empowerment.

After bringing Medicine 2.0 and RIVM to Twente University in 2010, Lucien Engelen founded TEDxMaastricht.

TED.com featured one of his TEDx talks on their worldwide platform.
