= Holographic grating =

Type of optical diffraction grating

In optics, a holographic grating is a type of diffraction grating formed by an interference-fringe field of two laser beams whose standing-wave pattern is exposed to a set of photosensitive materials. The exposure triggers chemical processes within the sample and results in the formation of a periodic structure that has the same periodicity of the recorded pattern. One of the most interesting features of these structures is their versatility and tunability as the optical response strongly depends on the blend of used materials, and their interactions with light during, and after, the recording procedure.

With the expertise earned over the years, nowadays holographic gratings are very efficient with no notable difference when compared to mechanically ruled gratings. Nevertheless, the lower limit over the grating spacing is one order of magnitude smaller than the latter. Their availability, low cost, and versatility opened the path for their use in a various range of applications such as data storage, holographic display and in general, as holographic optical components.
