= Palmer Luckey =

American entrepreneur (born 1992)

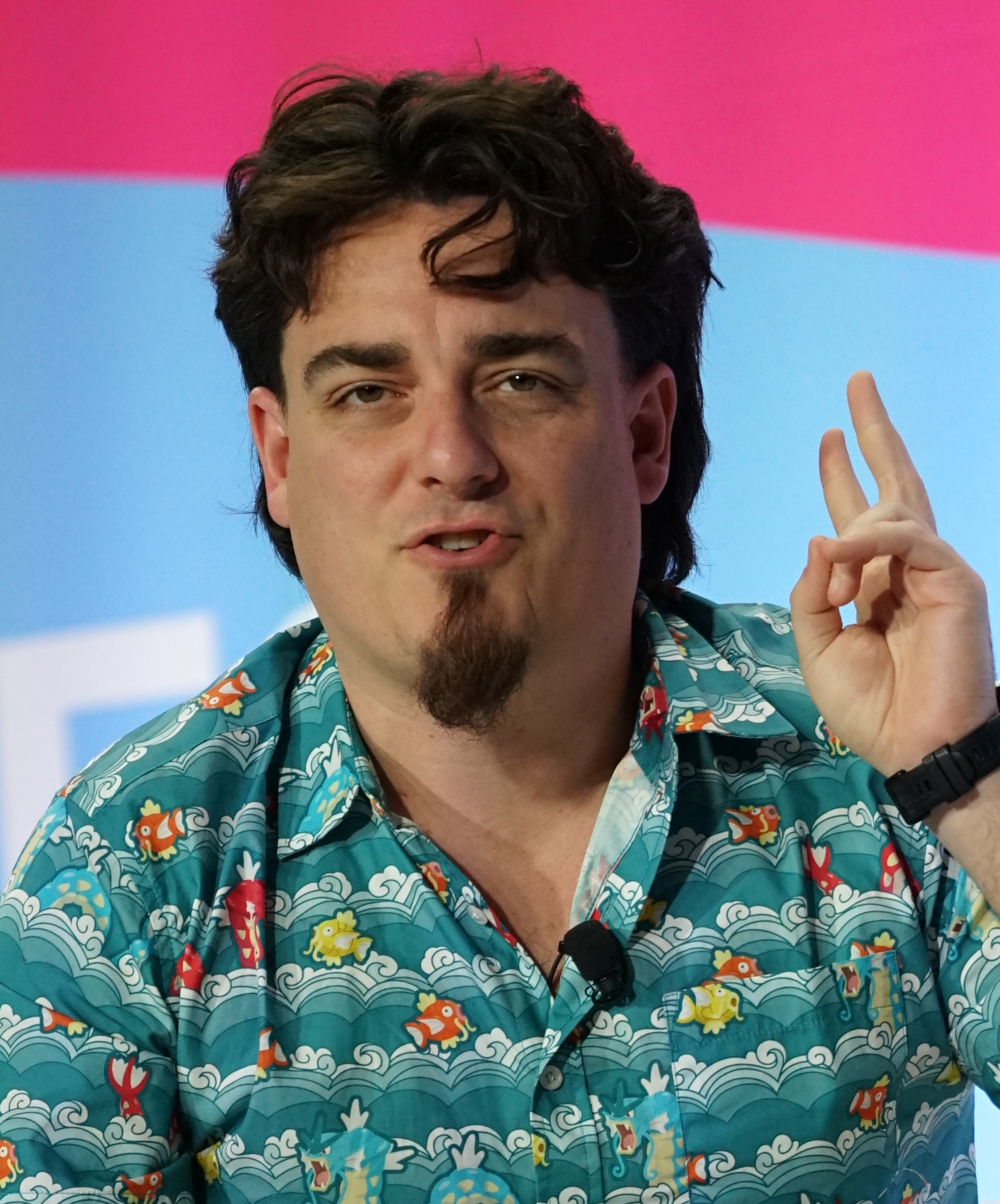
- Luckey in 2026
- Born: Palmer Freeman Luckey; September 19, 1992 (age 34); Long Beach, California, U.S.
- Education: California State University, Long Beach (attended)
- Known for: Founder of Anduril Industries; Founder of ModRetro; Founder of Oculus VR and designer of the Oculus Rift
- Spouse: Nicole Edelmann (m. 2019)
- Children: 1
- Relatives: Matt Gaetz (brother-in-law)
- Website: Official website

Palmer Freeman Luckey (born September 19, 1992) is an American entrepreneur and co-founder of military technology company Anduril Industries. He was the founder of Oculus VR and designer of the Oculus Rift, a virtual reality headset that is widely credited with reviving the virtual reality industry.

In 2017, Luckey co-founded Anduril Industries, a military technology company focused on autonomous drones and sensors for military applications. Luckey ranked number 22 on Forbes' 2016 List of America's Richest Entrepreneurs Under 40. As of September 2026, Forbes values his net worth at $6 billion.

== Early life and education ==
Luckey was born and raised in Long Beach, California, with three younger sisters. His father worked at a car dealership.

As a child he was homeschooled by his mother, took sailing lessons, and developed an intense interest in electronics and engineering. He took courses at Golden West College and Long Beach City College beginning at the age of 14 or 15, and then at California State University, Long Beach, in 2010. He later majored in journalism at CSU Long Beach, where he also wrote and was Online Editor for the university's student-run newspaper, then the Daily Forty-Niner, now known as the Long Beach Current as of 2024.

During his childhood and teenage years, Luckey experimented with a variety of complex electrical projects including railguns, Tesla coils, and lasers, with some of these projects resulting in serious injuries. He built a PC gaming "rig" worth tens of thousands of U.S. dollars with an elaborate six-monitor setup.

In 2009, he founded the ModRetro Forums with a friend, creating an online community for "portabilization", a hobby that revolves around turning old hardware devices (such as game consoles and PCs) into self-contained portable units mixing new and old technology.

While attending college, he also worked part-time as an engineer in the Mixed Reality Lab (MxR) of the Institute for Creative Technologies (ICT) at the University of Southern California designing cost-effective virtual reality systems for BRAVEMIND, a U.S. Army Research Laboratory effort to treat veterans suffering from PTSD.

== Career ==
=== Oculus VR ===
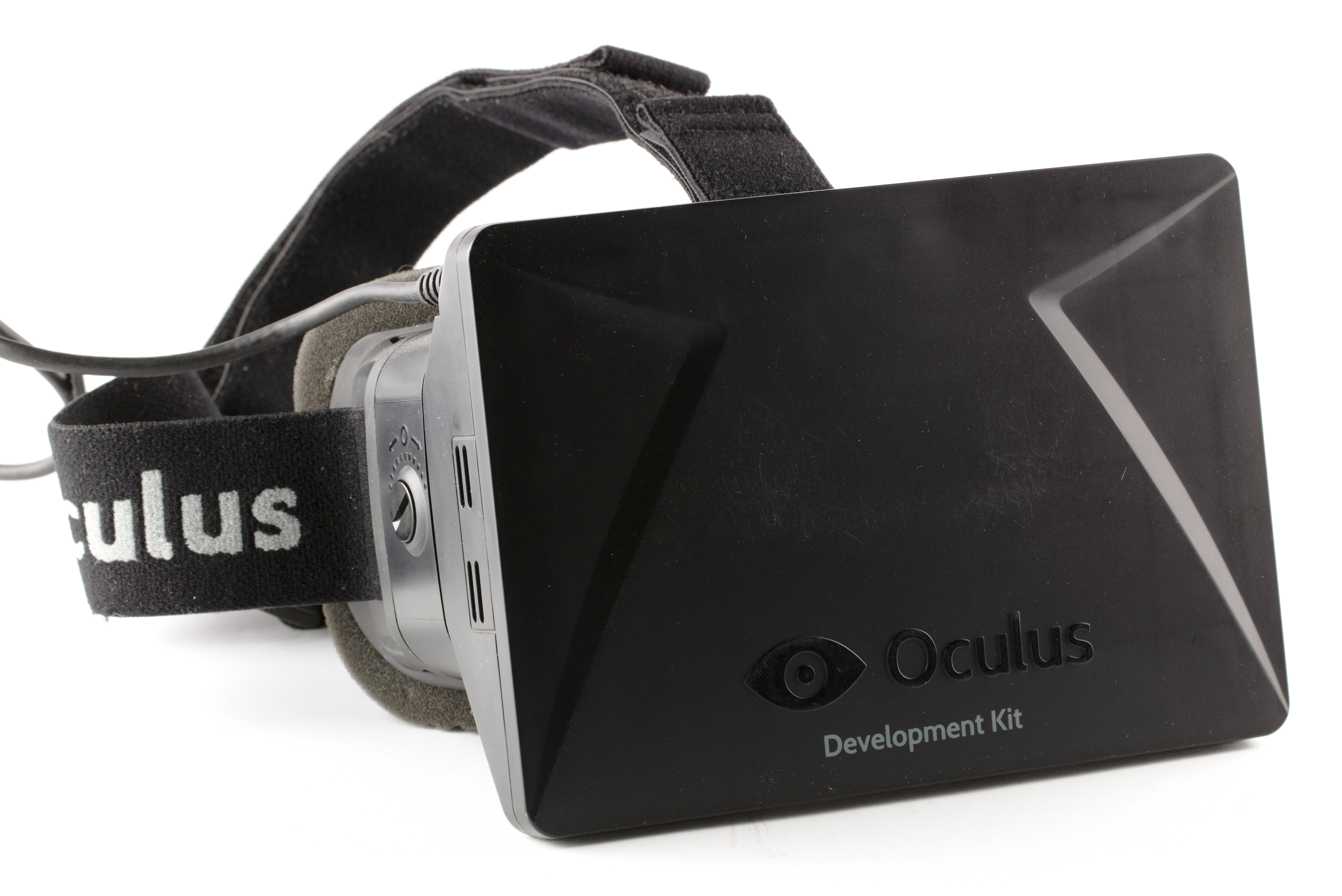
The Oculus Rift DK1, the first commercial VR headset released by Oculus VR

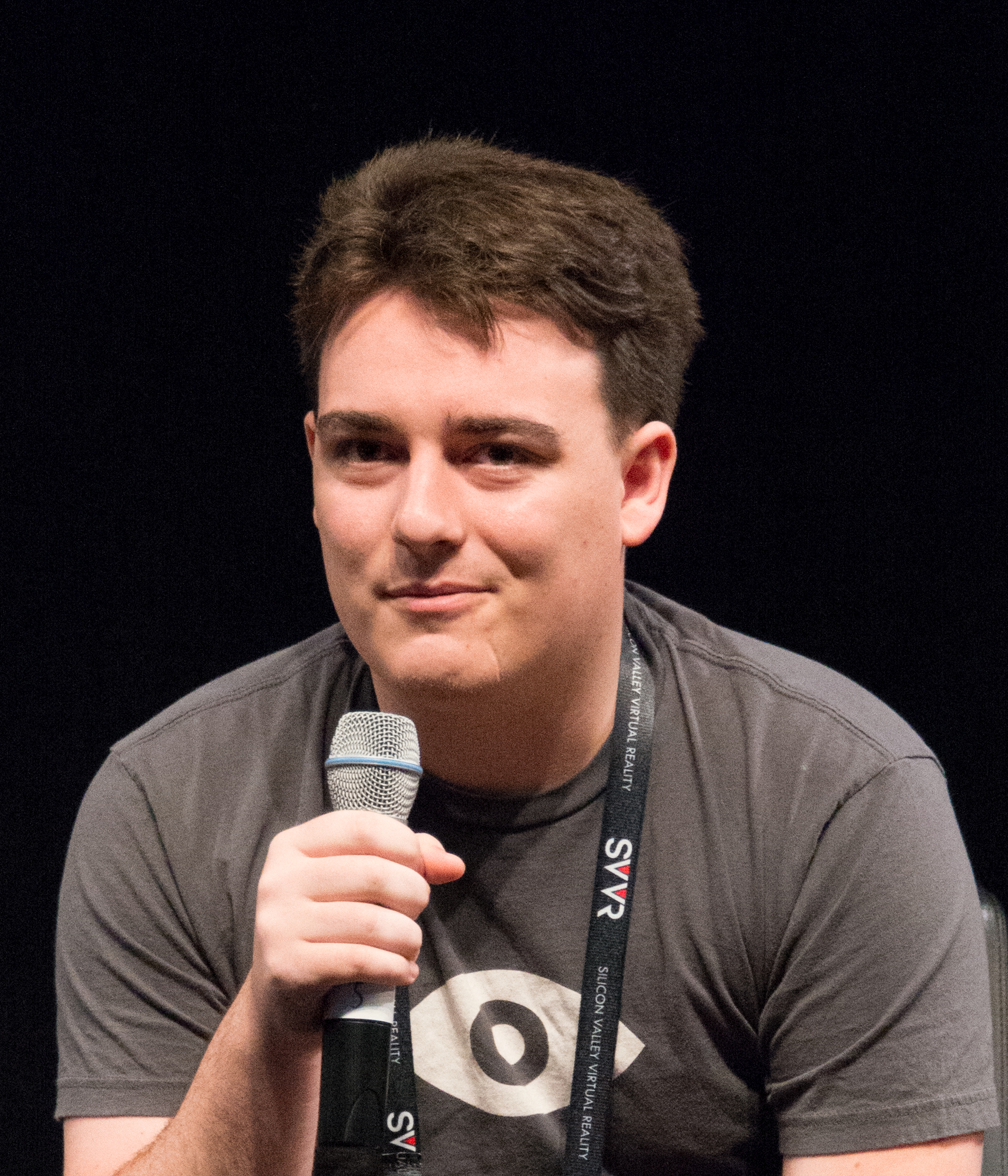
Luckey speaking at SVVR in 2014

In 2009, when he was 16, he began building virtual reality headsets of his own design. Existing head-mounted displays suffered from low contrast and field-of-view, high latency and cost, and extreme bulk and weight. He completed his first prototype, called PR1, at age 17 in his parents' garage. It featured a 90-degree field of view, low latency, and built-in haptic feedback. Ultimately, he built more than 50 head-mounted displays. (Note: Headsets in his collection include the Vuzix iWear VR920, eMagin Z800 3DVisor, Fakespace Push, Liquid Image Corporation MRG2, Visionics LVES, and a heavily modified Sony HMZ-T1.) To fund these projects, he earned at least US$36,000 by fixing and reselling damaged iPhones and working part-time as a groundskeeper, youth sailing coach, and computer repair technician.

Luckey developed a series of prototypes exploring features like 3D stereoscopy, wireless connectivity, and extreme 270-degree field-of-view, while also decreasing the size and weight of his systems. He shared regular updates on his progress on MTBS3D, an online forum frequented by virtual reality enthusiasts. He called his 6th-generation unit the "Oculus Rift", which was intended to be sold as a do-it-yourself kit on Kickstarter to fellow enthusiasts. He founded Oculus VR in April 2012 to facilitate the launch of the Kickstarter campaign.

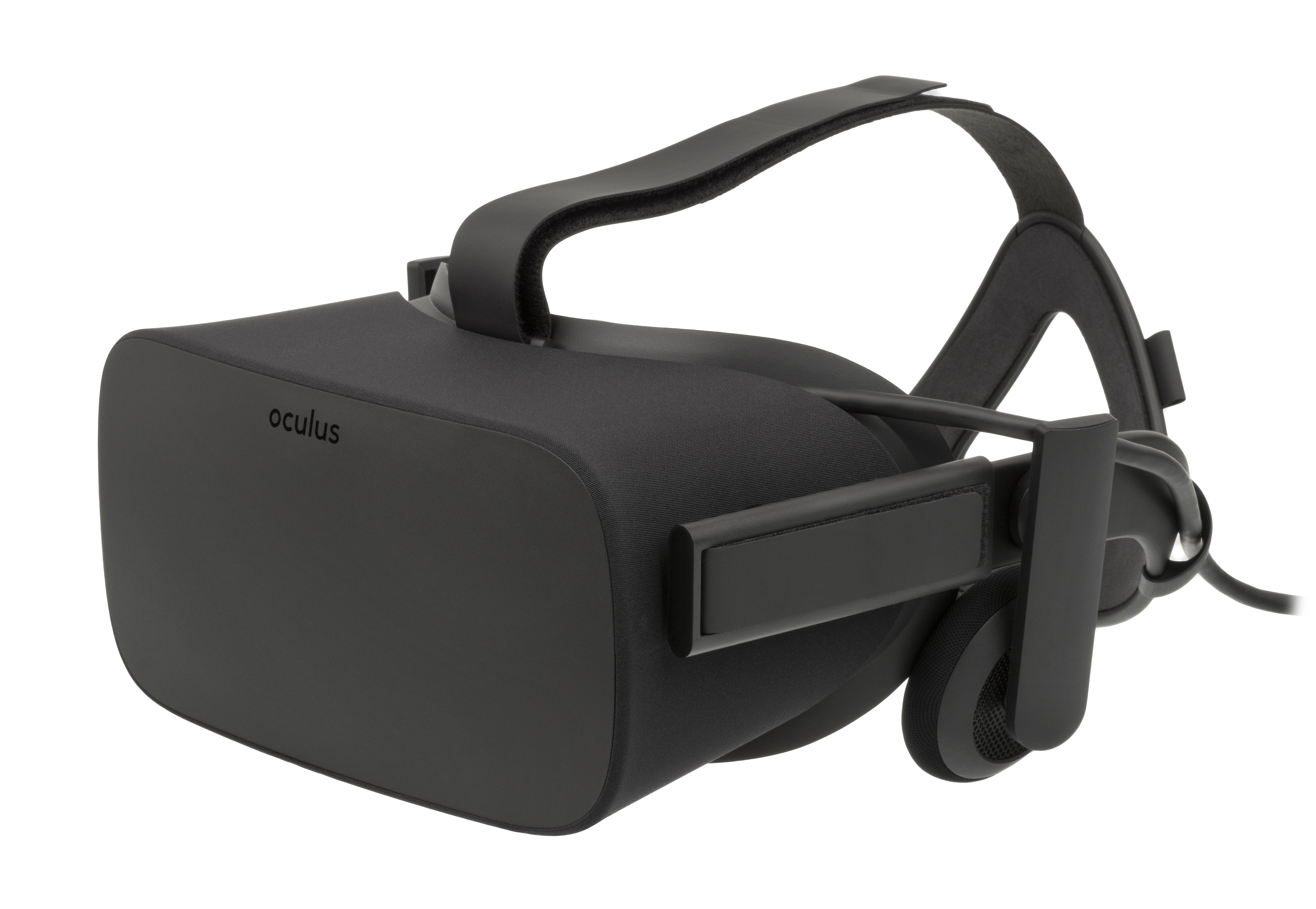
The Oculus Rift CV1, the first consumer VR headset released by Oculus VR

John Carmack of id Software requested a prototype headset from Luckey, who lent it to Carmack free of charge. Carmack used it to demonstrate id Software's Doom 3: BFG Edition on the device at the Electronic Entertainment Expo 2012. With the resulting attention of thousands of people drawn to the Rift, Luckey dropped out of university to focus on it full-time.

Luckey also demonstrated the unit to Valve, and received a Kickstarter endorsement from Valve's president Gabe Newell, who said, "It looks incredibly exciting. If anybody is going to tackle this set of hard problems, we think that Palmer is going to do it. We strongly encourage you to support this Kickstarter." When Luckey launched his Kickstarter campaign for the Oculus Rift, it also contained recorded endorsements from other prominent figures in the game industry, including Cliff Bleszinski and Michael Abrash.

During the Kickstarter campaign, Luckey demonstrated the Rift to gamers and the press at many gaming conventions, including PAX, Gamescom, and QuakeCon 2012. The Kickstarter campaign was successful, raising US$2.4 million, or 974% of its original target. After raising more than $1 million, Luckey hired Brendan Iribe in August 2012 to be CEO of Oculus. Oculus VR expanded, taking on more employees and a larger office space. Luckey described his day-to-day process as not having "changed all that much," remaining a "slow plod towards making this thing a reality." Luckey continued to work on all aspects of the business, saying, "I have my hands in everything, from product engineering to game development to marketing," Later, he shifted his focus towards virtual reality input hardware, calling it a "pet project" that eventually culminated in the Oculus Touch spatial controller.

=== Facebook ===
Oculus VR was acquired by Facebook in March 2014 for US$2 billion. Although Luckey's share was not made public, Forbes magazine estimated his net worth to be $700 million in 2015.

==== ZeniMax lawsuit ====
Shortly after the Facebook acquisition, ZeniMax Media filed a lawsuit in the United States District Court for the Northern District of Texas. The lawsuit contended that Luckey and Oculus used ZeniMax's "trade secrets, copyrighted computer code, and technical know-how relating to virtual reality technology", and sought financial damages for breach of contract, copyright infringement, and unfair competition. ZeniMax claimed it had invested "tens of millions of dollars in research and development" into VR technology, and that "Oculus and Luckey lacked the necessary expertise and technical know-how to create a viable virtual reality headset".

The jury trial completed on February 2, 2017. The jury found that Luckey had violated a non-disclosure agreement he had with ZeniMax, but awarded zero damages on this charge, judging the harm as de minimis. Though the jury found that Oculus, Facebook, Palmer Luckey, Brendan Iribe, and John Carmack did not misappropriate or steal trade secrets and technology, they awarded a combined total of $500 million in damages for copyright infringement related to the marketing of the Oculus Rift, with Luckey responsible for $50 million of the total.

In June 2018, the judge overseeing the case affirmed the jury's award of $200 million for breach of contract and $50 million for copyright infringement, but dismissed the remaining $250 million owed by Luckey and other parties.

==== Political involvement and firing ====
In September 2016, it was reported that Luckey had donated $10,000 to Nimble America, a pro-Donald Trump group that ran a billboard depicting 2016 presidential candidate Hillary Clinton with the caption "Too Big to Jail". This caused a small number of developers to temporarily cancel plans to support Oculus, including Scruta Games, which announced it would cancel Oculus's support in their games unless Luckey stepped down. Tomorrow Today Labs said they would not support the Oculus Touch as long as Luckey was employed by Oculus. Tomorrow Today Labs later reversed that position after Oculus began distancing themselves from Luckey and refocused on diversity and inclusion.

In March 2017, Palmer Luckey left Facebook and stopped his involvement with Oculus VR. No explanation for the departure was given by either party. As part of testimony before the United States Senate in April 2018, Senator Ted Cruz asked Facebook CEO Mark Zuckerberg, "Why was Palmer Luckey fired?" Zuckerberg refused to get into the "specific personnel matter", saying only that "it was not because of a political view".

In November 2018, The Wall Street Journal obtained access to internal Facebook emails which suggested the matter was discussed at the highest levels of the company. Facebook executives, including Zuckerberg, reportedly pressured Luckey to publicly voice support for libertarian candidate Gary Johnson, despite his support for then Republican nominee Donald Trump. After his firing, Luckey hired an employment lawyer, and together negotiated a payout of at least $100 million, arguing that the company had violated California law for allegedly pressuring the executive to voice support for Johnson and for punishing an employee for political activity.

Meta CTO Andrew Bosworth, who moved from the Ads team to leading the Oculus division four months after Luckey's departure, issued a series of tweets in November 2018 (subsequently deleted) denying wrongdoing on the part of Facebook, saying "Politics had nothing to do with Palmer's departure." Facebook likewise denied Luckey had been fired for supporting Trump, stating "We can say unequivocally that Palmer's departure was not due to his political views." In an interview with 60 Minutes in May 2025, Luckey stated that, "Well, you know, everyone's got a different story, but it boils down to I gave $9,000 to a political group that was for Donald Trump and against Hillary Clinton."

=== Anduril Industries ===
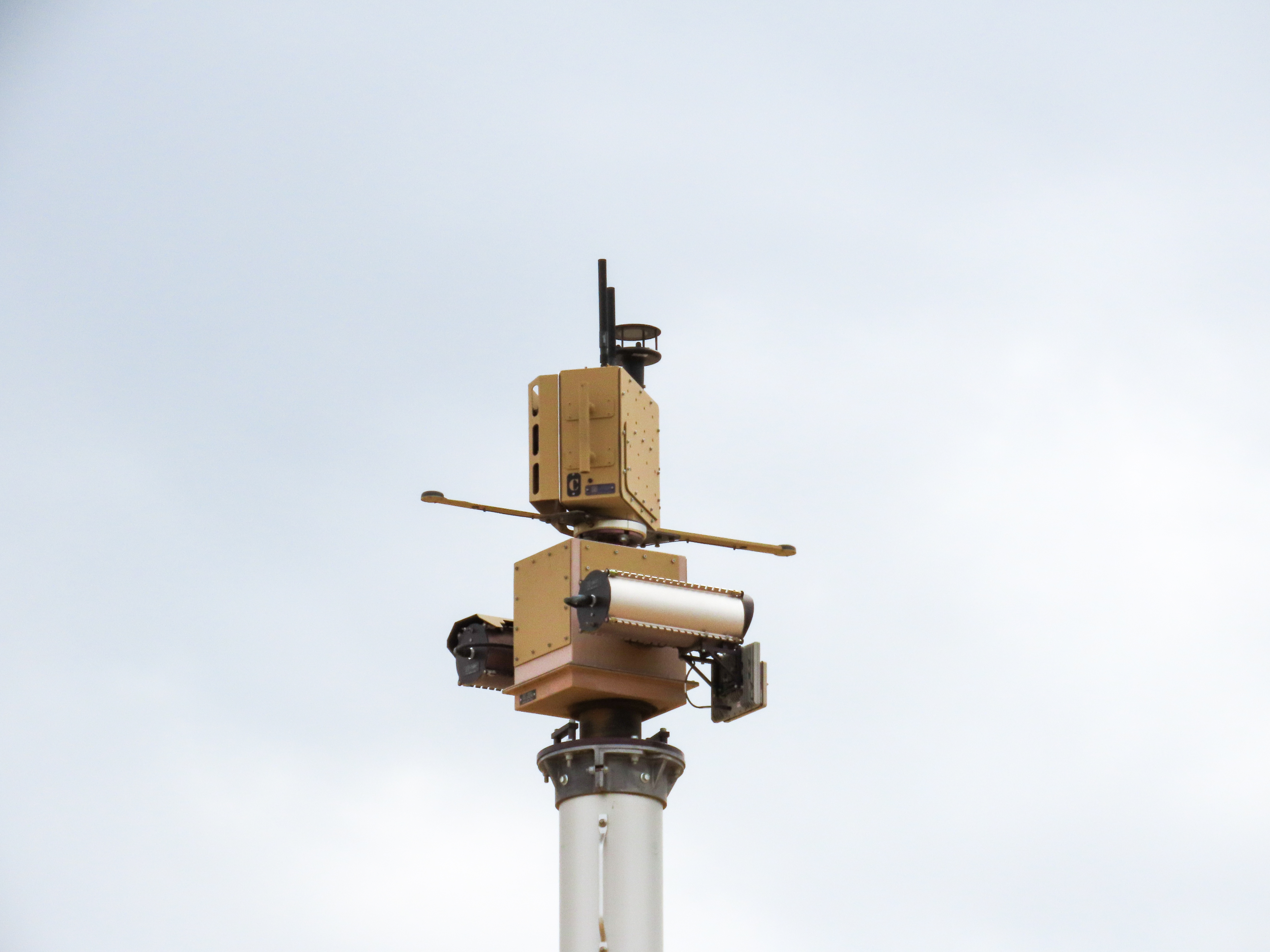
Anduril Sentry Tower

In June 2017, Luckey founded the autonomy-focused military technology company Anduril Industries, along with former Palantir Technologies executives Matt Grimm, Trae Stephens, and Brian Schimpf, and early Oculus VR Hardware Lead Joseph Chen. In March 2018, Anduril began a pilot program for the US government to detect human trafficking and drug smuggling in remote areas of the southern border of the US; the program led to 55 attempted entrants being caught in its first 12 days in operation. Anduril later won the Autonomous Surveillance Tower Program of Record, resulting in the deployment of hundreds of Anduril Sentry Towers at a cost of "hundreds of millions of dollars".

In September 2020, Luckey announced through Twitter that Anduril had received a contract worth $967M for the Advanced Battle Management Systems (ABMS), a cutting-edge multi-billion dollar project by the U.S. Air Force.

In February 2022, Luckey announced that Anduril had won a $1 billion contract to lead counter-unmanned systems work for United States Special Operations Command (SOCOM).

On December 26, 2025, Luckey was sanctioned by China for what it said was his role in selling arms to Taiwan. The Wall Street Journal said the sanctions were symbolic as "U.S. defense contractors generally do little business in China."

=== "VR headset that kills its user" art piece ===
In November 2022, it was announced that as a commemoration of the anime Sword Art Online, Luckey created a VR headset art piece that kills its human user in real life when the user dies digitally in the video game, by means of several explosive charges affixed above the screen, on what appears to be a modified Meta Quest Pro, to aim the blast at the user's forebrain.

Luckey blogged, "The idea of tying your real life to your virtual avatar has always fascinated me—you instantly raise the stakes to the maximum level and force people to fundamentally rethink how they interact with the virtual world and the players inside it." Luckey additionally described it as "just a piece of office art, a thought-provoking reminder of unexplored avenues in game design". He also mentioned that while it is "the first non-fiction example of a VR device that can actually kill the user, it won't be the last."

=== ModRetro ===
In June 2024, Luckey reestablished ModRetro as a video game console company. Its first product, the ModRetro Chromatic, is a handheld retrogaming device capable of playing original games designed for the Game Boy, developed by Nintendo. Its second product is the M64, a recreation of the Nintendo 64.

=== Warhound ===
In October 2026, Luckey and Ben Lamm announced the founding of Warhound, a company that aims to create genetically engineered war dogs.

== Public image ==
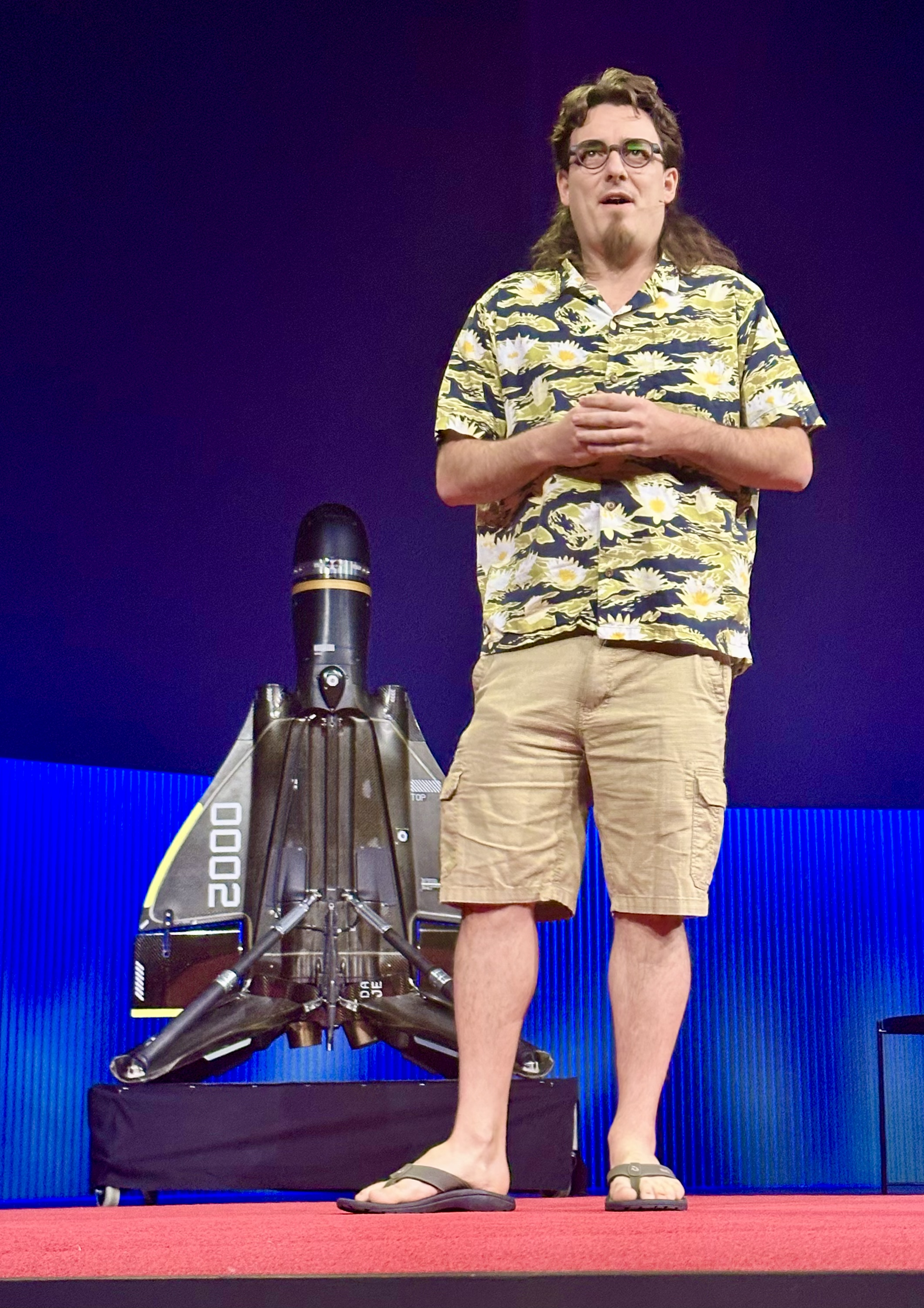
Palmer Luckey speaking at TED, April 2025

In 2014, Luckey was described as "the face of virtual reality in gaming" and a celebrity among virtual reality enthusiasts; however, he has stated he does not consider himself to be a celebrity. He maintains a casual appearance, is frequently barefoot, and prefers sandals to shoes even at trade shows and events.

In 2015, Luckey was featured on the cover of Time magazine in the article "The Surprising Joy of Virtual Reality", in an image that was widely ridiculed on the internet, raising questions as to whether the entire field of VR had been damaged.

The character Keenan Feldspar, played by Haley Joel Osment, who appeared on several episodes of the HBO TV show Silicon Valley in 2017, was speculated by some to be based on Luckey. Like Luckey, Feldspar is a young entrepreneur who became rich after selling his VR technology, and who tends to wear Hawaiian shirts.

== Political activity ==
Luckey has donated to the campaigns of dozens of Republican political candidates, U.S. senators, and members of the U.S. House of Representatives. He has also donated to many Republican- and conservative-affiliated organizations, including the National Republican Congressional Committee, the 2017 Presidential Inaugural Committee, Mike Pence's Great America Committee, and many state Republican Party chapters.

Luckey donated $7,000 to Mike Rogers, $3,500 to Betty McCollum, and $7,000 to Dan Sullivan in 2026.

=== Fundraising for Donald Trump ===
In September 2016, Luckey donated $10,000 to an organization called "Nimble America" with the stated purpose of "educating the community on our ideals of America First, Smart Trade, Legal Immigration, and Ethical Behavior". Luckey offered to match further contributions from r/The_Donald users for 48 hours after the announcement. Luckey later issued an apology, stating on his Facebook page, "I am deeply sorry that my actions are negatively impacting the perception of Oculus and its partners." He stated that he acted independently, not as a representative of Oculus VR. The Wall Street Journal later reported that Luckey had been pressured into making this statement as a condition of employment.

In October 2020, Luckey hosted a fundraiser for Donald Trump at his home in Lido Isle, Newport Beach, with the president in attendance. The fundraiser had tickets ranging from $2,800 per person to $150,000 per couple, and there were gatherings both for and against President Trump in Newport Beach outside during the event.

On June 8, 2024, Luckey co-hosted another fundraiser for Trump at the home of health insurance company co-founder John Word, where donors spent up to $100,000 per person to attend.

== Personal life ==
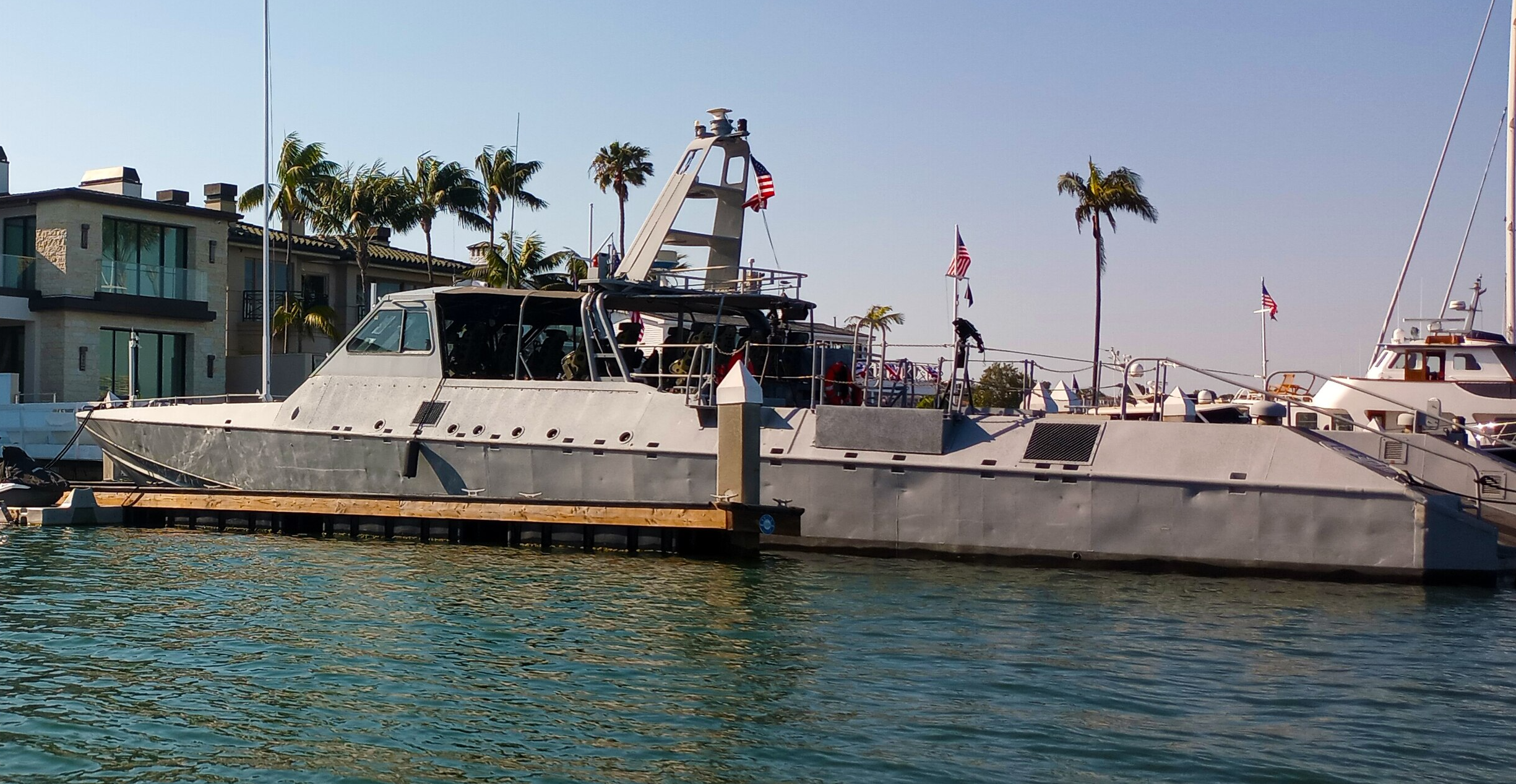
Luckey's Mark V Special Operations Craft

Luckey married his long-time girlfriend Nicole Edelmann in 2019. The couple have a child. They live in Newport Beach, California.

Luckey's sister, Ginger Luckey, is married to former U.S. representative Matt Gaetz.

Luckey is a collector of military vehicles; he owns a Mark V Special Operations Craft that he bought from the US Navy, two submarines, and six helicopters, including a Sikorsky UH-60 Black Hawk, among other items.

In a 2024 interview, Luckey described himself as a "radical Zionist".
