= Head-mounted display =

Type of display device

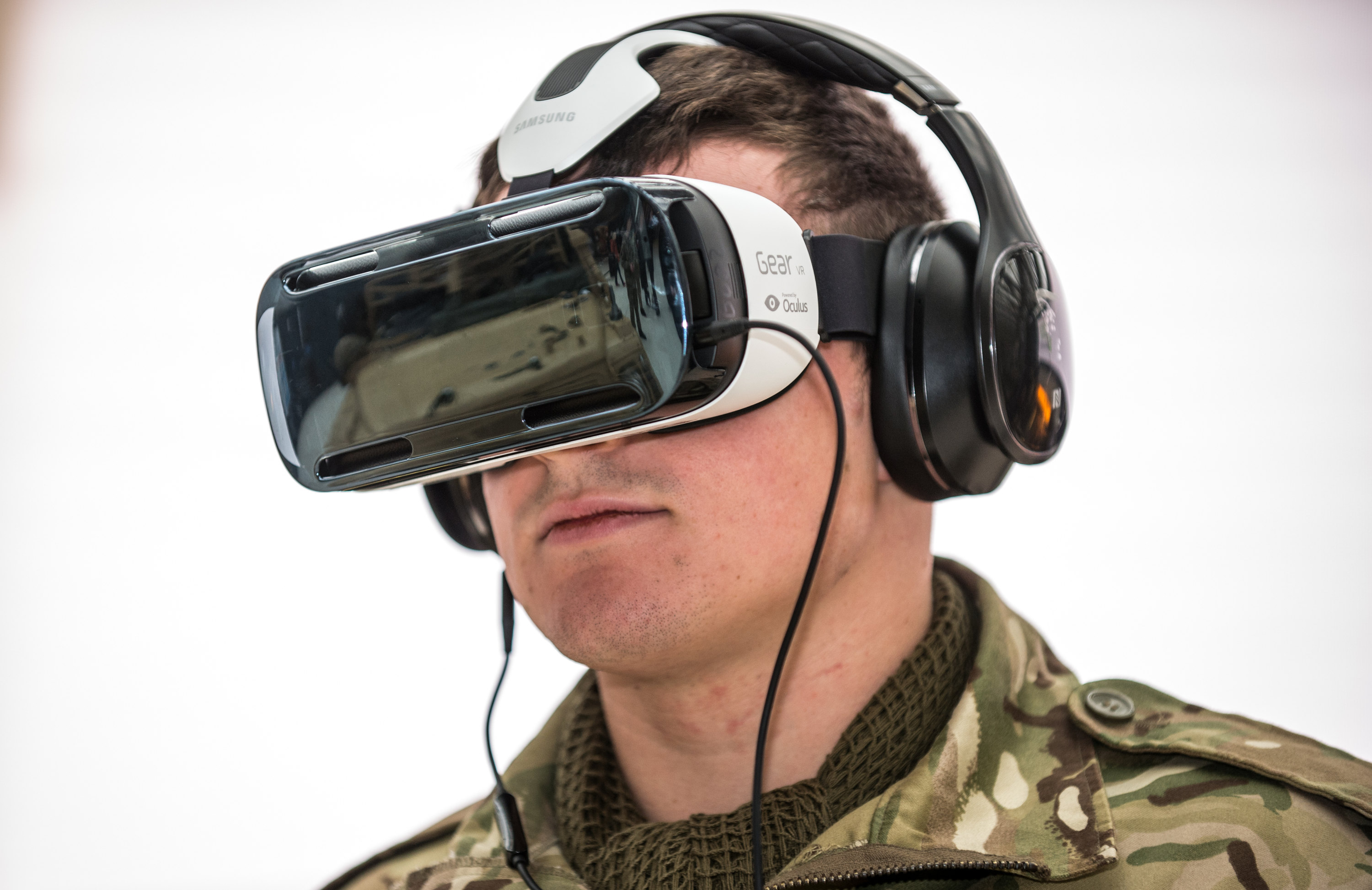
British Army Reserve soldier wearing a Samsung Gear VR virtual reality headset

A head-mounted display (HMD) is a display device, worn on the head or as part of a helmet, that has a small display optic in front of one (monocular HMD) or each eye (binocular HMD). HMDs have many uses including gaming, aviation, engineering, and medicine.

Virtual reality headsets are a type of HMD that track 3D position and rotation to provide a virtual environment to the user. 3DOF VR headsets typically use an IMU for tracking. 6DOF VR headsets typically use sensor fusion from multiple data sources including at least one IMU.

An optical head-mounted display (OHMD) is a wearable display that can reflect projected images and allows a user to see through it.

== Overview ==
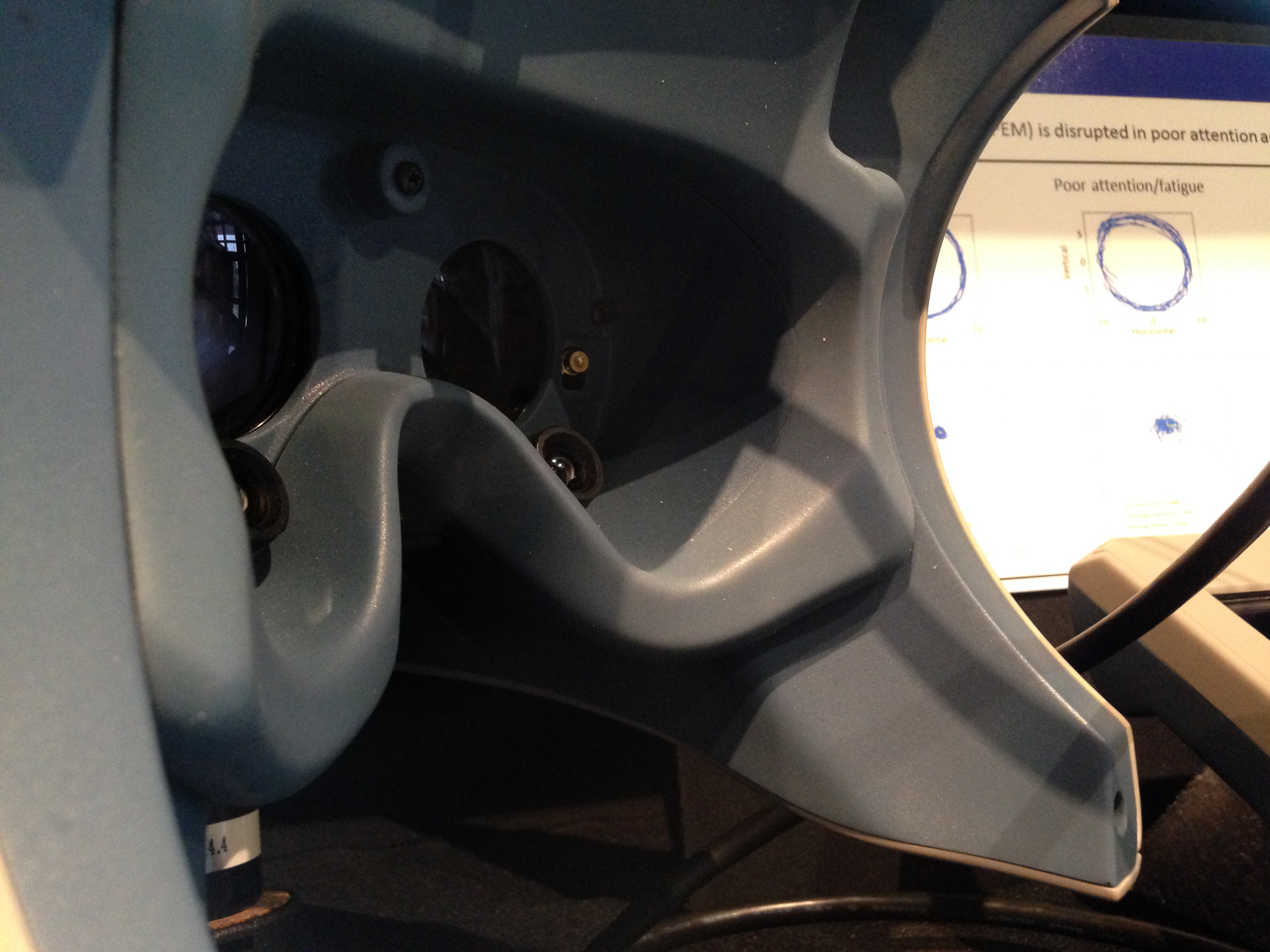
An eye tracking HMD with LED illuminators and cameras to measure eye movements

A typical HMD has one or two small displays, with lenses and semi-transparent mirrors embedded in eyeglasses (also termed data glasses), a visor, or a helmet. The display units are miniaturized and may include cathode-ray tubes (CRT), liquid-crystal displays (LCDs), liquid crystal on silicon (LCoS), or organic light-emitting diodes (OLED). Some vendors employ multiple micro-displays to increase total resolution and field of view.

HMDs differ in whether they can display only computer-generated imagery (CGI), or only live imagery from the physical world, or combination. Most HMDs can display only a computer-generated image, sometimes referred to as virtual image. Some HMDs can allow a CGI to be superimposed on real-world view. This is sometimes referred to as augmented reality (AR) or mixed reality (MR). Combining real-world view with CGI can be done by projecting the CGI through a partially reflective mirror and viewing the real world directly. This method is often called optical see-through. Combining real-world view with CGI can also be done electronically by accepting video from a camera and mixing it electronically with CGI.

By using AR technology, the HMDs are allowed to achieve a see-through display. By using virtual reality (VR) technology, the HMDs can realize viewing the images in 360 degrees.

== History ==
The first head-mounted display with motion tracking was the Headsight, built in 1961 by Philco Corporation engineers Charles Comeau and James Bryan. It paired a helmet-mounted cathode ray tube with a magnetic tracking system that steered a remote camera, letting an operator look around a distant environment by turning their head. The Headsight was built for military remote surveillance rather than computer-generated imagery.

In 1968, computer scientist Ivan Sutherland and his student Bob Sproull built the first HMD to display computer-generated graphics, at Harvard University. The system rendered stereoscopic wire-frame images that shifted with the wearer's head movement, and could overlay graphics onto the real world through half-silvered mirrors — working as both a virtual reality and augmented reality display. Its mechanical head-position sensor, suspended from the ceiling, earned the informal nickname "Sword of Damocles."

Consumer VR headsets appeared in the early 1990s but failed to gain mainstream adoption due to high costs and limited image quality. Interest revived in 2012 when Palmer Luckey's Oculus Rift launched on Kickstarter, raising $2.4 million against a $250,000 goal within days. Facebook's acquisition of Oculus VR for approximately $2 billion in 2014 signaled that major technology companies considered consumer VR commercially viable.

== Optical HMD ==
An optical head-mounted display uses an optical mixer which is made of partly silvered mirrors. It can reflect artificial images, and let real images cross the lens, and let a user look through it. Various methods have existed for see-through HMD's, most of which can be summarized into two main families based on curved mirrors or waveguides. Curved mirrors have been used by Laster Technologies, and by Vuzix in their Star 1200 product. Various waveguide methods have existed for years. These include diffraction optics, holographic optics, polarized optics, and reflective optics.

== Applications ==
Major HMD applications include military, government (fire, police, etc.), and civilian-commercial (medicine, video gaming, sports, etc.).

=== Aviation and tactical, ground ===
U.S. Air Force flight equipment technician testing a Scorpion helmet mounted integrated targeting system

In 1962, Hughes Aircraft Company revealed the Electrocular, a compact CRT (7" long), head-mounted monocular display that reflected a TV signal in to transparent eyepiece. Ruggedized HMDs are increasingly being integrated into the cockpits of modern helicopters and fighter aircraft. These are usually fully integrated with the pilot's flying helmet and may include protective visors, night vision devices, and displays of other symbology.

Military, police, and firefighters use HMDs to display tactical information such as maps or thermal imaging data while viewing a real scene. Recent applications have included the use of HMD for paratroopers. In 2005, the Liteye HMD was introduced for ground combat troops as a rugged, waterproof lightweight display that clips into a standard U.S. PVS-14 military helmet mount. The self-contained color monocular organic light-emitting diode (OLED) display replaces the NVG tube and connects to a mobile computing device. The LE has see-through ability and can be used as a standard HMD or for augmented reality applications. The design is optimized to provide high definition data under all lighting conditions, in covered or see-through modes of operation. The LE has a low power consumption, operating on four AA batteries for 35 hours or receiving power via standard Universal Serial Bus (USB) connection.

The Defense Advanced Research Projects Agency (DARPA) continues to fund research in augmented reality HMDs as part of the Persistent Close Air Support (PCAS) Program. Vuzix is currently working on a system for PCAS that will use holographic waveguides to produce see-through augmented reality glasses that are only a few millimeters thick.

=== Engineering ===
Engineers and scientists use HMDs to provide stereoscopic views of computer-aided design (CAD) schematics. Virtual reality, when applied to engineering and design, is a key factor in integration of the human in the design. By enabling engineers to interact with their designs in full life-size scale, products can be validated for issues that may not have been visible until physical prototyping. The use of HMDs for VR is seen as supplemental to the conventional use of CAVE for VR simulation. HMDs are predominantly used for single-person interaction with the design, while CAVEs allow for more collaborative virtual reality sessions.

Head Mounted Display systems are also used in the maintenance of complex systems, as they can give a technician a simulated x-ray vision by combining computer graphics such as system diagrams and imagery with the technician's natural vision (augmented or modified reality).

=== Medicine and research ===
There are also applications in surgery, wherein a combination of radiographic data (X-ray computed tomography (CAT) scans, and magnetic resonance imaging (MRI) imaging) is combined with the surgeon's natural view of the operation, and anesthesia, where the patient vital signs are within the anesthesiologist's field of view at all times.

Research universities often use HMDs to conduct studies related to vision, balance, cognition and neuroscience. As of 2010, the use of predictive visual tracking measurement to identify mild traumatic brain injury was being studied. In visual tracking tests, a HMD unit with eye tracking ability shows an object moving in a regular pattern. People without brain injury are able to track the moving object with smooth pursuit eye movements and correct trajectory.

=== Gaming and video ===
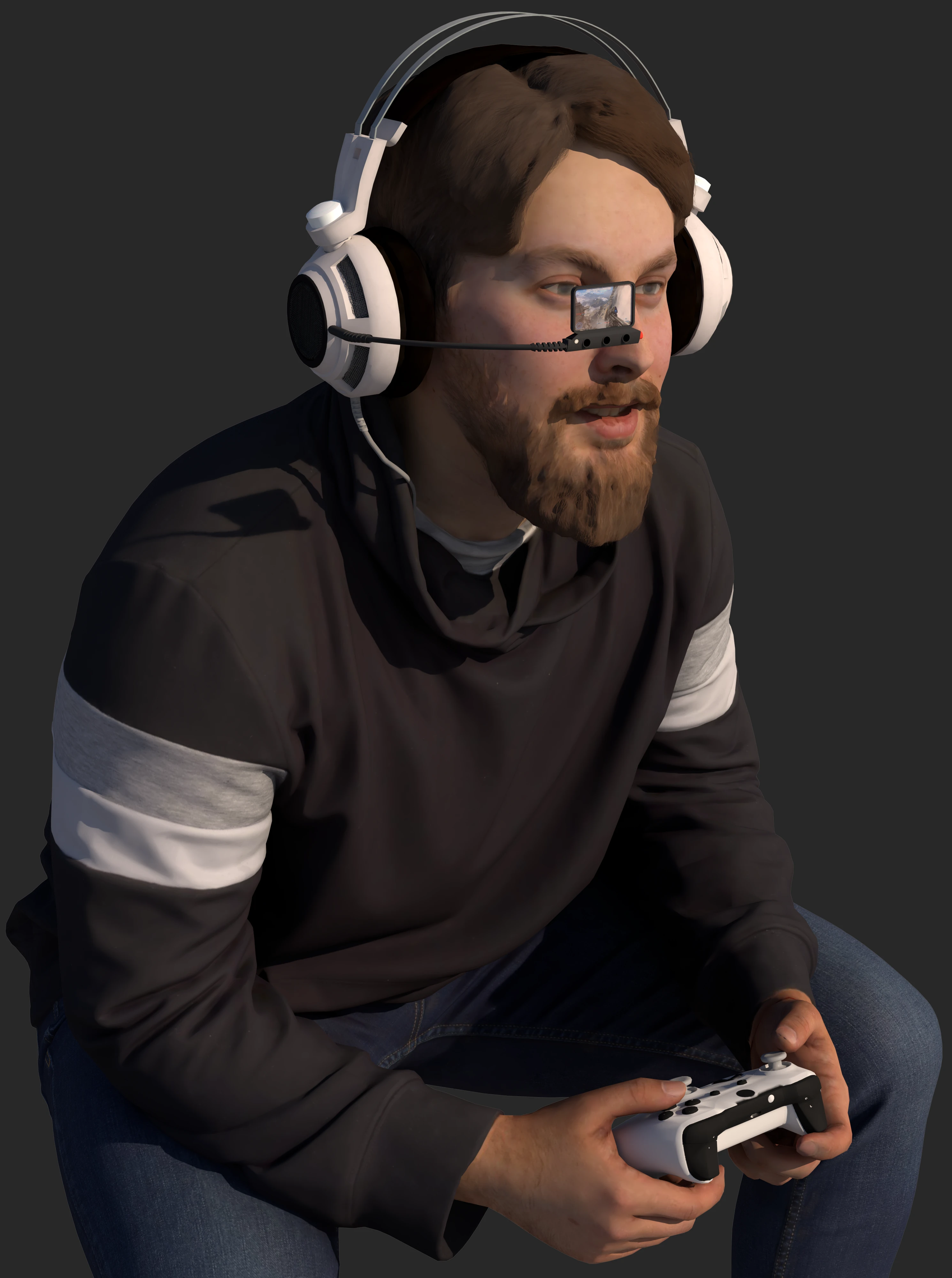
Headset computer concept

Low-cost HMD devices are available for use with 3D games and entertainment applications. One of the first commercially available HMDs was the Forte VFX1 which was announced at Consumer Electronics Show (CES) in 1994. The VFX-1 had stereoscopic displays, 3-axis head-tracking, and stereo headphones. Another pioneer in this field was Sony, which released the Glasstron in 1997. It had as an optional accessory a positional sensor which permitted the user to view the surroundings, with the perspective moving as the head moved, providing a deep sense of immersion. One novel application of this technology was in the game MechWarrior 2, which permitted users of the Sony Glasstron or Virtual I/O's iGlasses to adopt a new visual perspective from inside the cockpit of the craft, using their own eyes as visual and seeing the battlefield through their craft's own cockpit.

Many brands of video glasses can be connected to modern video and DSLR cameras, making them applicable as a new age monitor. As a result of the glasses ability to block out ambient light, filmmakers and photographers are able to see clearer presentations of their live images.

The Oculus Rift is a virtual reality (VR) head-mounted display created by Palmer Luckey that the company Oculus VR developed for virtual reality simulations and video games. The HTC Vive is a virtual reality head-mounted display. The headset is produced by a collaboration between Valve and HTC, with its defining feature being precision room-scale tracking, and high-precision motion controllers. The PlayStation VR is a virtual reality headset for gaming consoles, dedicated for the PlayStation 4. Windows Mixed Reality is a platform developed by Microsoft which includes a wide range of headsets produced by HP, Samsung, and others and is capable of playing most HTC Vive games. It uses only inside-out tracking for its controllers.

=== Virtual cinema ===
Some head-mounted displays are designed to present traditional video and film content in a virtual cinema. These devices typically feature a relatively narrow field of view (FOV) of 50–60°, making them less immersive than virtual-reality headsets, but they offer correspondingly higher resolution in terms of pixels per degree. Released in 2011, the Sony HMZ-T1 featured 1280x720 resolution per eye. In approximately 2015, standalone Android 5 (Lollipop) based "private cinema" products were released using various brands such as VRWorld, Magicsee, based on software from Nibiru.

Products released as of 2020 featuring 1920×1080 resolution per eye included the Goovis G2 and Royole Moon. Also available was the Avegant Glyph, which incorporated 720P retinal projection per eye, and the Cinera Prime, which featured 2560×1440 resolution per eye as well as a 66° FOV. The rather large Cinera Prime used either a standard support arm or an optional head mount. Expected to be available in late-2021 was the Cinera Edge, featuring the same FOV and 2560×1440 resolution per eye as the earlier Cinera Prime model, but with a much more compact form factor. Other products available in 2021 were the Cinemizer OLED, with 870×500 resolution per eye, the VISIONHMD Bigeyes H1, with 1280x720 resolution per eye, and the Dream Glass 4K, with 1920x1080 resolution per eye. All of the products mentioned here incorporated audio headphones or earphones except for the Goovis G2, the Cinera Prime, the VISIONHMD Bigeyes H1, and the Dream Glass 4K, which instead offered an audio headphones jack.

=== Remote control ===
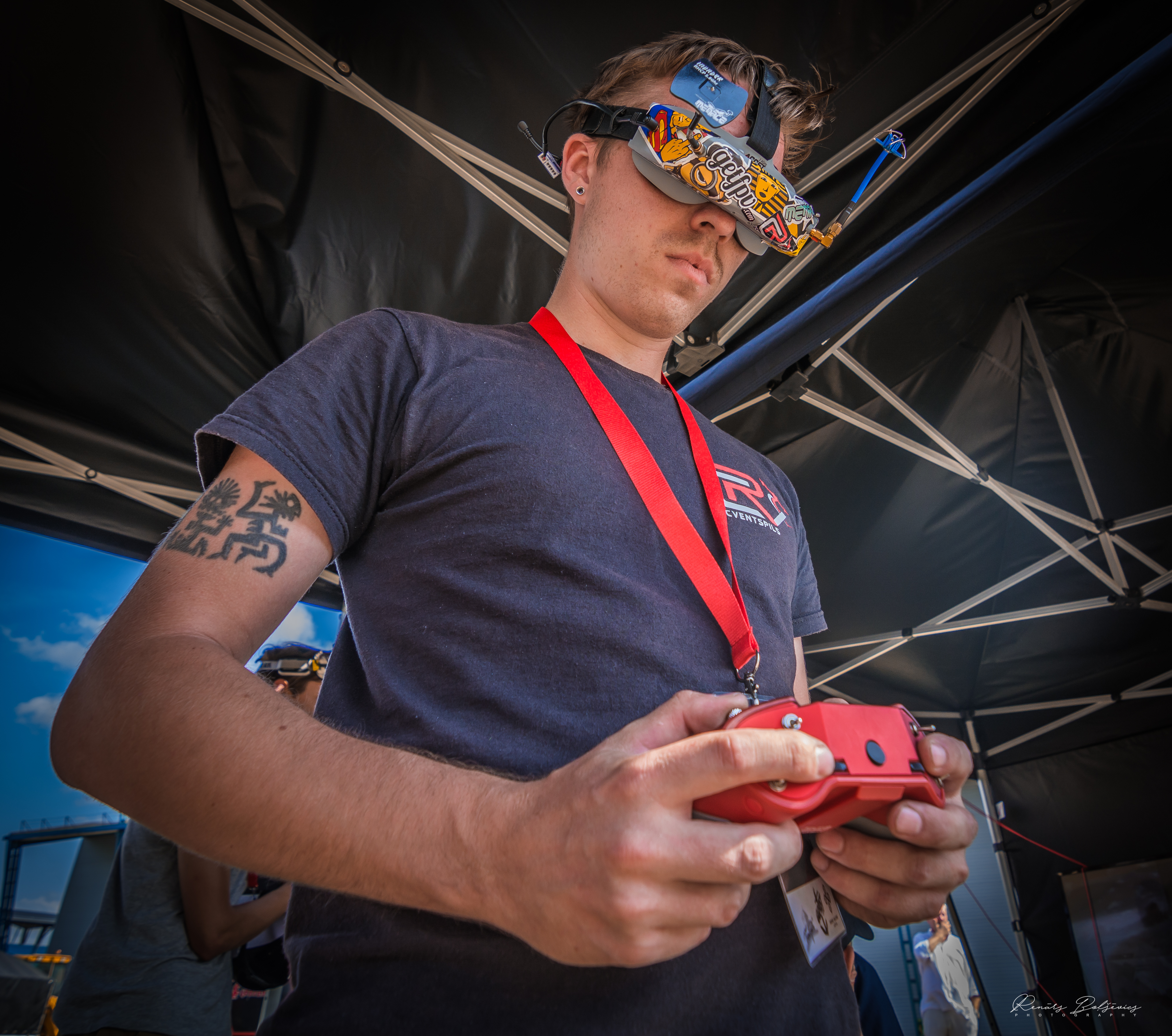
Drone racer wearing FPV goggles

First-person view (FPV) drone flying uses head-mounted displays which are commonly called "FPV goggles". Analog FPV goggles (such as the ones produced by Fat Shark) are commonly used for drone racing as they offer the lowest video latency. But digital FPV goggles (such as produced by DJI) are becoming increasingly popular due to their higher resolution video.

Since 2010s, FPV drone flying is widely used in aerial cinematography and aerial photography.

=== Sports ===
A HMD system has been developed for Formula One drivers by Kopin Corp. and the BMW Group. The HMD displays critical race data while allowing the driver to continue focusing on the track as pit crews control the data and messages sent to their drivers through two-way radio. Recon Instruments released on 3 November 2011 two head-mounted displays for ski goggles, MOD and MOD Live, the latter based on an Android operating system.

=== Training and simulation ===
A key application for HMDs is training and simulation, allowing to virtually place a trainee in a situation that is either too expensive or too dangerous to replicate in real-life. Training with HMDs covers a wide range of applications from driving, welding and spray painting, flight and vehicle simulators, dismounted soldier training, medical procedure training, and more. However, a number of unwanted symptoms have been caused by prolonged use of certain types of head-mounted displays, and these issues must be resolved before optimal training and simulation is feasible.

== Performance parameters ==
- Ability to show stereoscopic imagery. A binocular HMD has the potential to display a different image to each eye. This can be used to show stereoscopic images. It should be borne in mind that so-called 'Optical Infinity' is generally taken by flight surgeons and display experts as about 9 meters. This is the distance at which, given the average human eye rangefinder "baseline" (distance between the eyes or Interpupillary distance (IPD)) of between 2.5 and 3 inches (6 and 8 cm), the angle of an object at that distance becomes essentially the same from each eye. At smaller ranges the perspective from each eye is significantly different and the expense of generating two different visual channels through the computer-generated imagery (CGI) system becomes worthwhile.
- Interpupillary distance (IPD). This is the distance between the two eyes, measured at the pupils, and is important in designing head-mounted displays.
- Field of view (FOV) – Humans have an FOV of around 180°, but most HMDs offer far less than this. Typically, a greater field of view results in a greater sense of immersion and better situational awareness. Most people do not have a good feel for what a particular quoted FOV would look like (e.g., 25°) so often manufacturers will quote an apparent screen size. Most people sit about 60 cm away from their monitors and have quite a good feel about screen sizes at that distance. To convert the manufacturer's apparent screen size to a desktop monitor position, divide the screen size by the distance in feet, then multiply by 2. Consumer-level HMDs typically offer a FOV of about 110°.
- Resolution – HMDs usually mention either the total number of pixels or the number of pixels per degree. Listing the total number of pixels (e.g., 1600×1200 pixels per eye) is borrowed from how the specifications of computer monitors are presented. However, the pixel density, usually specified in pixels per degree or in arcminutes per pixel, is also used to determine visual acuity. 60 pixels/° (1 arcmin/pixel) is usually referred to as eye limiting resolution, above which increased resolution is not noticed by people with normal vision. HMDs typically offer 10 to 20 pixels/°, though advances in micro-displays help increase this number.
- Binocular overlap – measures the area that is common to both eyes. Binocular overlap is the basis for the sense of depth and stereo, allowing humans to sense which objects are near and which objects are far. Humans have a binocular overlap of about 100° (50° to the left of the nose and 50° to the right). The larger the binocular overlap offered by an HMD, the greater the sense of stereo. Overlap is sometimes specified in degrees (e.g., 74°) or as a percentage indicating how much of the visual field of each eye is common to the other eye.
- Accommodation support – HMDs that support matching the accommodation and vergence distances of the eyes are more comfortable than those that do not.
- Distant focus (collimation). Optical methods may be used to present the images at a distant focus, which seems to improve the realism of images that in the real world would be at a distance.
- On-board processing and operating system. Some HMD vendors offer on-board operating systems such as Android, allowing applications to run locally on the HMD, and eliminating the need to be tethered to an external device to generate video. These are sometimes referred to as smart goggles. To make the HMD construction lighter producers may move the processing system to connected smart necklace form-factor that would also offer the additional benefit of larger battery pack. Such solution would allow to design lite HMD with sufficient energy supply for dual video inputs or higher frequency time-based multiplexing (see below).

== Support of 3D video formats ==
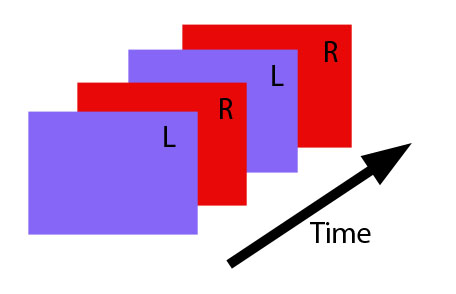
Frame sequential multiplexing

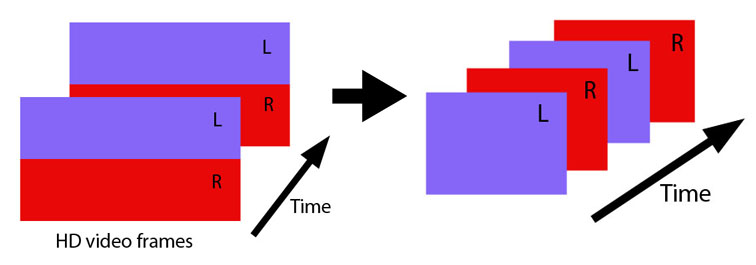
Side-by-side and top-bottom multiplexing

Depth perception inside an HMD requires different images for the left and right eyes. There are multiple ways to provide these separate images:

- Use dual video inputs, thereby providing a completely separate video signal to each eye
- Time-based multiplexing. Methods such as frame sequential combine two separate video signals into one signal by alternating the left and right images in successive frames.
- Side by side or top-bottom multiplexing. This method allocated half of the image to the left eye and the other half of the image to the right eye.

The advantage of dual video inputs is that it provides the maximum resolution for each image and the maximum frame rate for each eye. The disadvantage of dual video inputs is that it requires separate video outputs and cables from the device generating the content.

Time-based multiplexing preserves the full resolution per each image, but reduces the frame rate by half. For example, if the signal is presented at 60 Hz, each eye is receiving just 30 Hz updates. This may become an issue with accurately presenting fast-moving images.

Side-by-side and top-bottom multiplexing provide full-rate updates to each eye, but reduce the resolution presented to each eye. Many 3D broadcasts, such as ESPN, chose to provide side-by-side 3D which saves the need to allocate extra transmission bandwidth and is more suitable to fast-paced sports action relative to time-based multiplexing methods.

Not all HMDs provide depth perception. Some lower-end modules are essentially bi-ocular devices where both eyes are presented with the same image. 3D video players sometimes allow maximum compatibility with HMDs by providing the user with a choice of the 3D format to be used.

== Peripherals ==
- The most rudimentary HMDs simply project an image or symbology on a wearer's visor or reticle. The image is not bound to the real world, i.e., the image does not change based on the wearer's head position.
- More sophisticated HMDs incorporate a positioning system that tracks the wearer's head position and angle, so that the picture or symbol displayed is congruent with the outside world using see-through imagery.
- Head tracking – Binding the imagery. Head-mounted displays may also be used with tracking sensors that detect changes of angle and orientation. When such data is available in the system computer, it can be used to generate the appropriate computer-generated imagery (CGI) for the angle-of-look at the particular time. This allows the user to look around a virtual reality environment simply by moving the head without the need for a separate controller to change the angle of the imagery. In radio-based systems (compared to wires), the wearer may move about within the tracking limits of the system.
- Eye tracking – Eye trackers measure the point of gaze, allowing a computer to sense where the user is looking. This information is useful in a variety of contexts such as user interface navigation: By sensing the user's gaze, a computer can change the information displayed on a screen, bring added details to attention, etc.
- Hand tracking – tracking hand movement from the perspective of the HMD allows natural interaction with content and a convenient game-play mechanism

== See also ==
- List of optical head-mounted display manufacturers
- Computer-mediated reality
- Eyetap
- Head-up display (HUD)
- Lumus-optical
- Positioning technologies
- Screenless video
- Smartglasses
- Stereoscopy
- Virtual retinal display

== Bibliography ==
- Head Mounted Displays: Designing for the user; Melzer and Moffitt; McGraw Hill, 1997.
- O. Cakmakci and J.P. Rolland. Head-Worn Displays: A Review. IEEE Journal of Display Technology, Vol. 2, No. 3, September 2006..
- O. Cakmakci. Optical Design of Eyewear Displays. SPIE Press, PM388, 2025. ISBN 9781510688339. Publisher page
