= Glasstron =

Head-mounted display series by Sony

Sony Glasstron
- Sony Glasstron PLM-100
- Manufacturer: Sony
- Type: Head-mounted display
- Released: June 1996
- Discontinued: Yes
- Display: Dual TFT LCD
- Sound: Integrated stereo earphones
- Input: Composite video, S-Video, VGA (model dependent)

Glasstron was a line of portable head-mounted displays (HMD) produced by Sony from 1996 to the early 2000s. First introduced in Japan with the PLM-50 in June 1996, the devices were marketed primarily as personal viewing monitors for video playback and video games, simulating a large-screen television viewed from a distance. Widely viewed as an early precursor to modern virtual reality hardware, the Glasstron differed fundamentally from contemporary VR headsets by lacking spatial computing and positional tracking, operating strictly as a wearable display.

Prior to the Glasstron, Sony demonstrated prototype head-mounted displays, including the "Visortron" at consumer electronics exhibitions in the early to mid-1990s. The line was later discontinued, though Sony returned to consumer head-mounted displays in 2011 with the HMZ-T1.

== Features ==
The Glasstron utilized twin color liquid-crystal display screens positioned in front of the wearer's eyes, accompanied by integrated stereo earphones. Depending on the model, the optics simulated viewing a 52-inch screen from a distance of 2 meters (6.6 ft).

Select models, including the PLM-A55 and the flagship PLM-S700, incorporated an adjustable liquid crystal shutter system. By toggling the shutter, users could adjust the background visibility from fully opaque (for focused viewing) to semi-transparent, allowing the user to view their physical surroundings while watching video content.

Unlike modern virtual reality systems, the Glasstron included no spatial computing capabilities, sensors for head orientation, or positional tracking. Because the hardware lacked real-time spatial positioning, the projected image remained fixed directly in front of the wearer's line of sight rather than anchoring an interactive environment around them.

== Models ==
Model	Release date	Resolution	Video inputs	Notes
PLM-50	June 1996	0.7-inch LCD (approx. 180,000 pixels)	Composite video	First commercial model; released in Japan.
PLM-A35	June 1997	Dual 0.7-inch LCD	Composite, S-Video	Entry-level model with opaque visor.
PLM-A55	June 1997	Dual 0.7-inch LCD	Composite, S-Video	Included an electronic see-through shutter.
PLM-100	1998	Dual 0.7-inch LCD	Composite (NTSC)	Features see-through shutter functionality.
PLM-S700 / S700E	November 1998	SVGA (800×600 per eye)	VGA (15-pin), S-Video, Composite	"PC Glasstron" aimed at computer users; used 0.44-inch high-density LCDs (1.44 million dots total). PLM-S700 used NTSC video signals; S700E supported PAL.

== Software and accessories ==
While predominantly used for personal media consumption, third-party software and peripherals occasionally integrated the Glasstron. The PC release of MechWarrior 2: 31st Century Combat included native support for the display, allowing the player to view the cockpit directly inside the headset.

== See also ==
- Sony HMZ-T1
- Head-mounted display
- Spatial computing
- Virtual reality headset
