= VFX1 Headgear =

Virtual reality headset, 1995

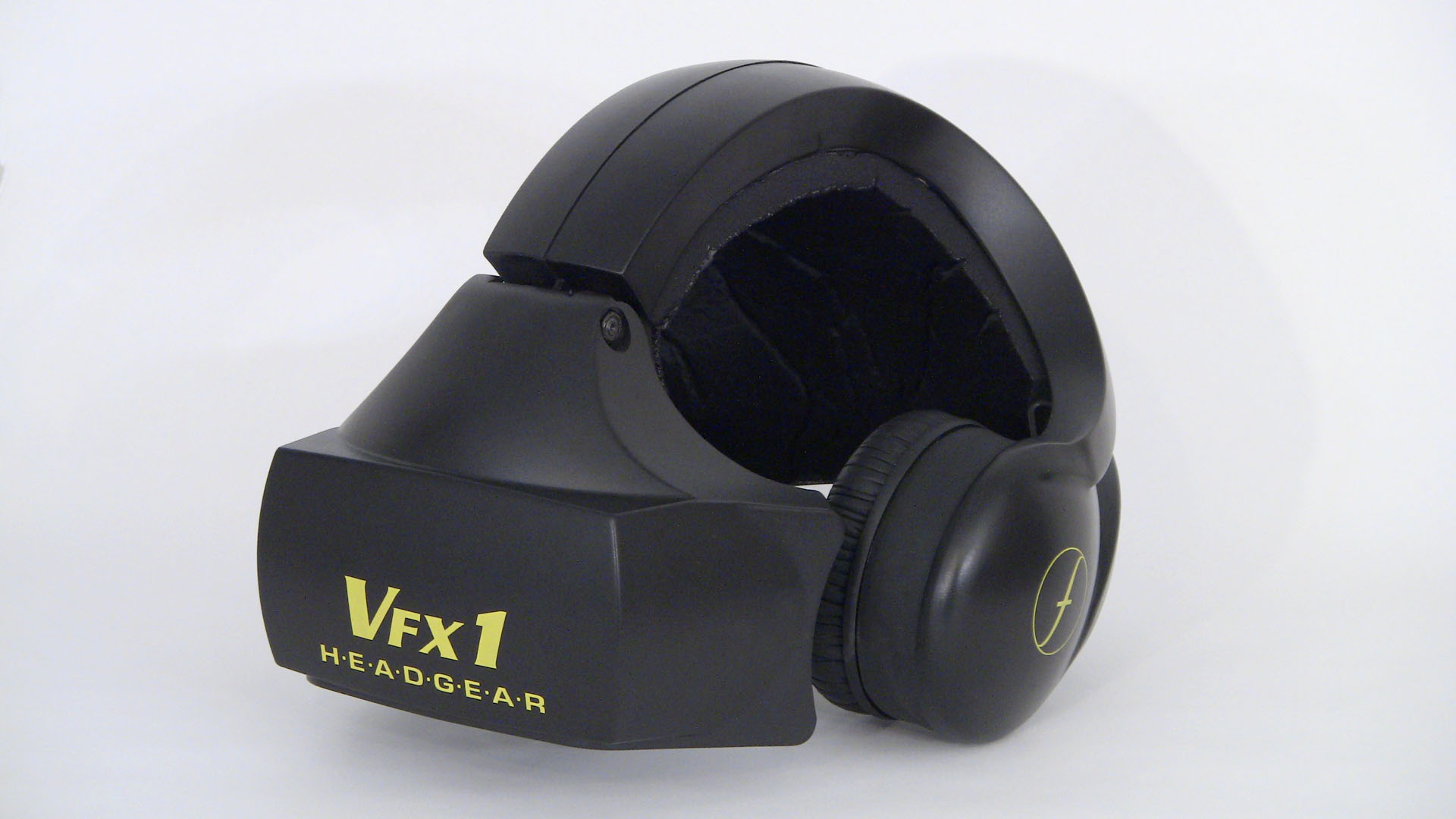
- Forte VFX1 Headgear
- Developer: Forte Technologies, Inc.
- Released: 1995
- Introductory price: US$695 (equivalent to $1,470 in 2025)
- Display: Dual 263 × 230 color LC displays
- Platform: IBM-compatible PC, ISA bus, MS-DOS
- Weight: 2.5 lb (1.1 kg)
- Successor: VFX3D

The Forte VFX1 Headgear was a consumer-level virtual reality headset marketed during the mid-1990s. It comprises a helmet, a handheld controller, and an ISA interface board, and offers head tracking, stereoscopic 3D, and stereo audio.

== History ==
The VFX1 Headgear was developed in the early 1990s by Forte Technologies, Inc. of Rochester, New York. It was released in 1995 with an MSRP of US$695 and an average retail price of $599, and was sold in the US in retail stores including CompUSA and Babbage's.

It was superseded by Interactive Imaging Systems' VFX3D in 2000. IIS was founded in 1997 after purchasing the assets of Forte Technologies and does business as Vuzix as of 2023.

== Features ==
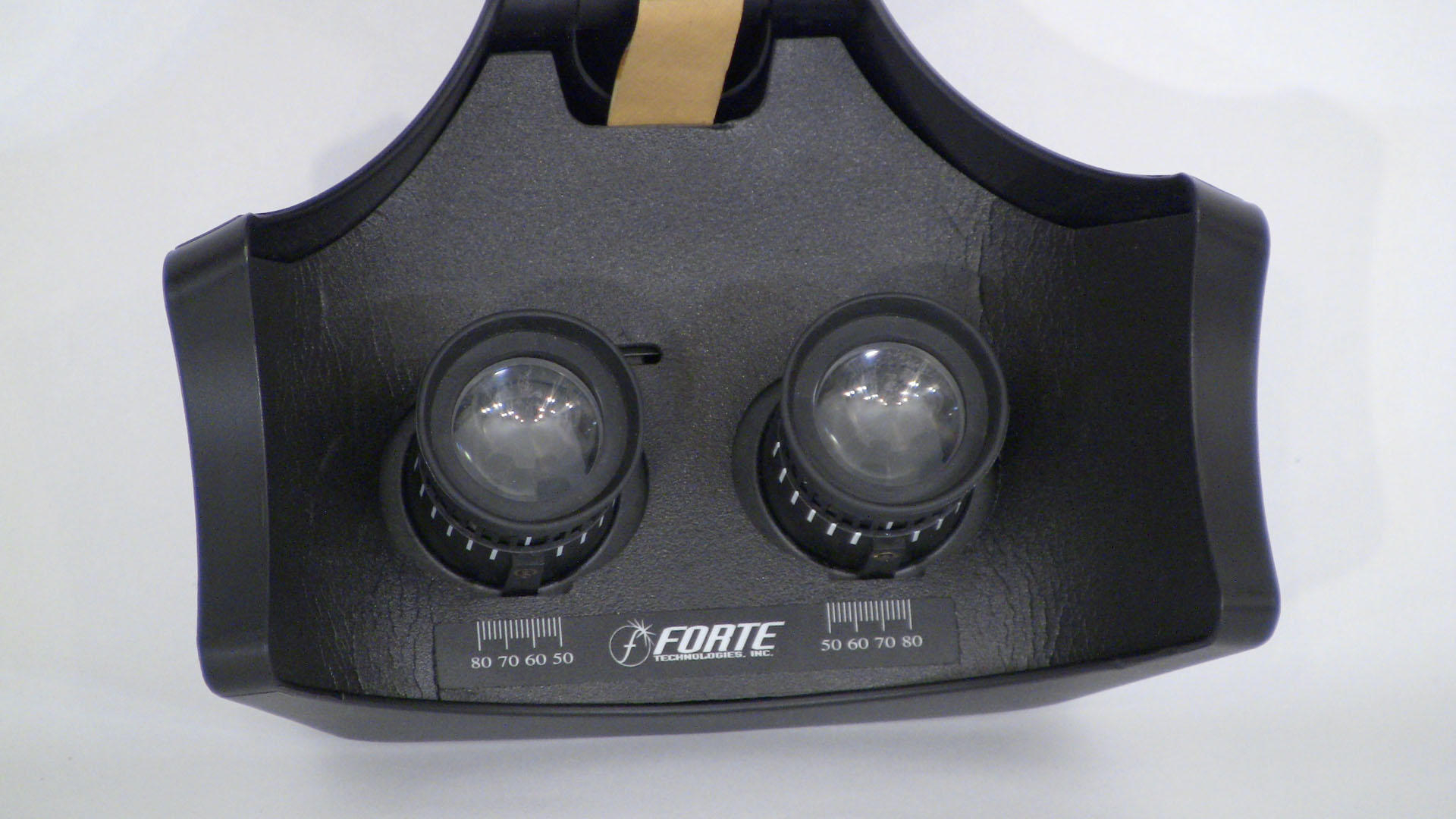
Lenses inside the visor

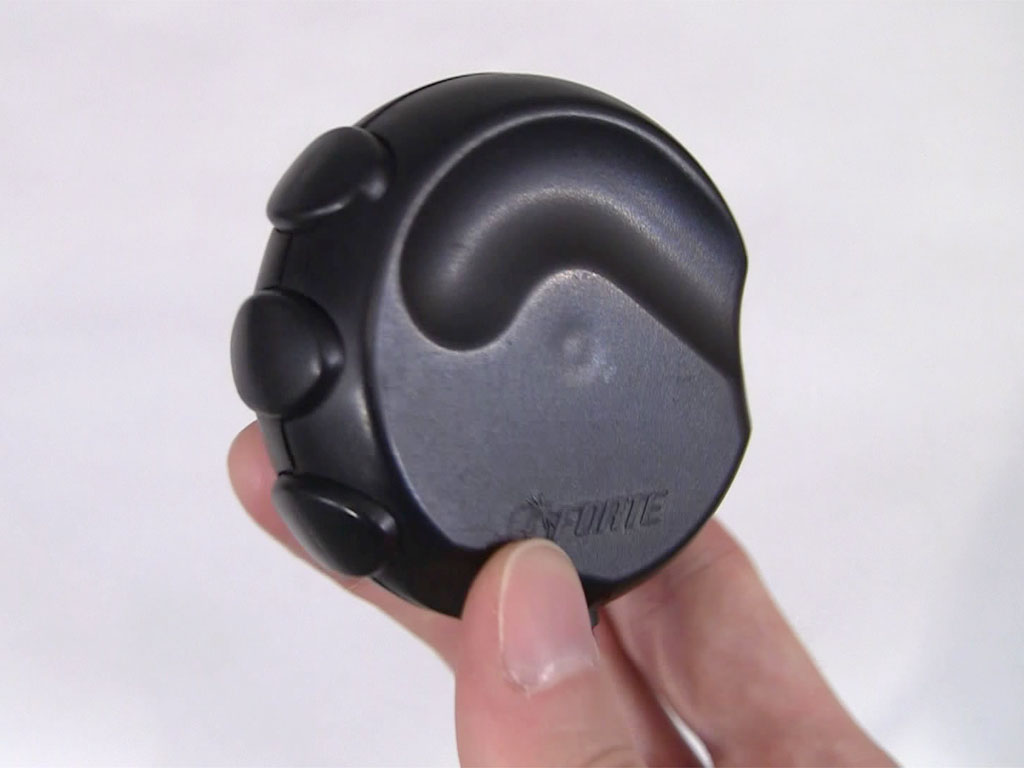
CyberPuck handheld controller

Visual: The helmet features dual 0.7" 263 × 230 active matrix liquid-crystal displays from Kopin capable of 256 colors. Optics comprise dual lenses with adjustable focus and interpupillary distance. Field of view is 45 degrees diagonally.

Auditory: The helmet includes built-in stereo speakers and a condenser microphone. Audio signals are routed to the sound card's line in/out jacks.

Tracking: Head movements are tracked with internal sensors for pitch (70 degrees), roll (70 degrees), and yaw (360 degrees). A hand-held controller called the CyberPuck offers three buttons and internal sensors for pitch and roll. It can emulate a mouse and is connected to the helmet by an ACCESS.bus interface cable.

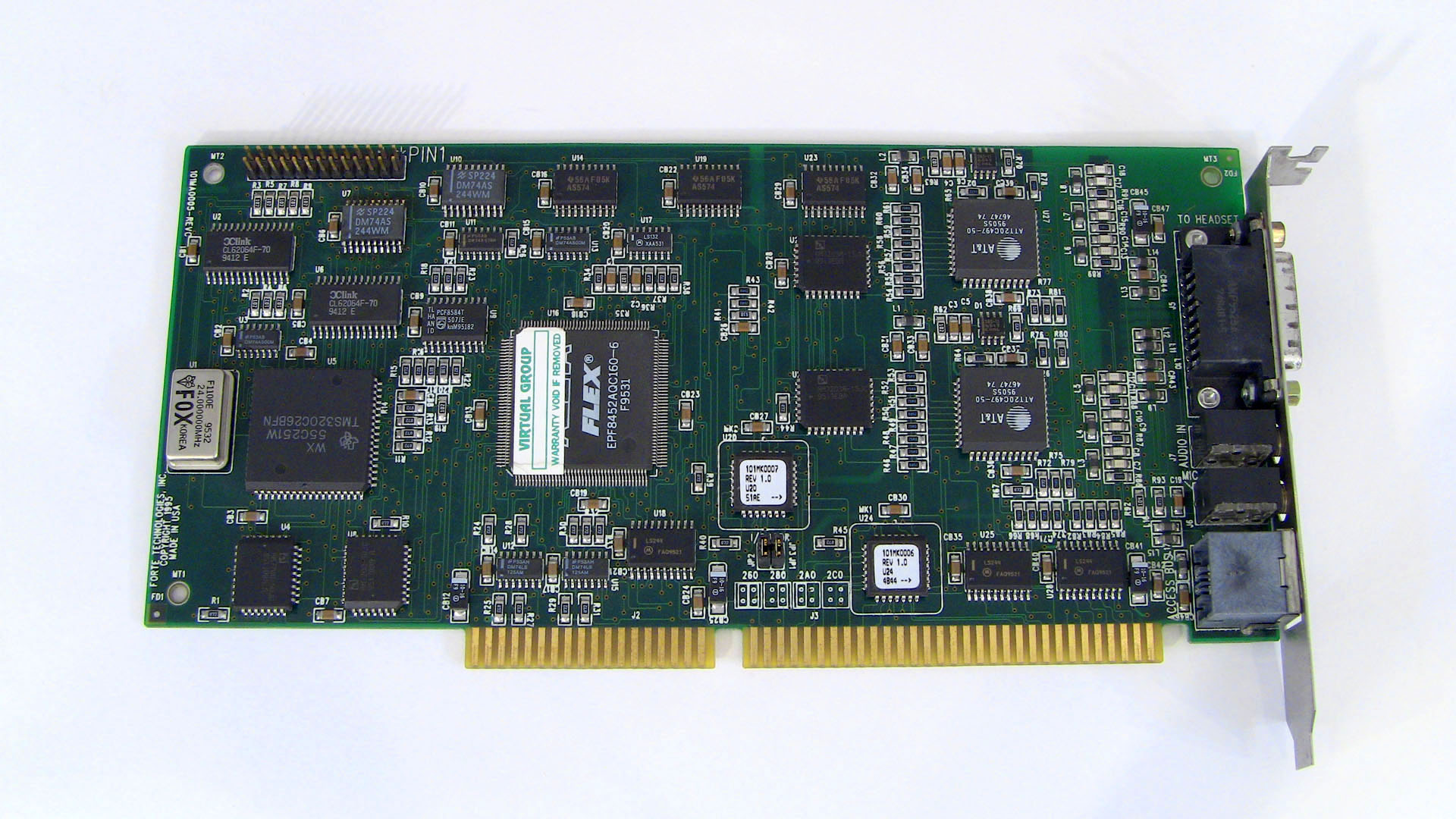
VIP interface board

Interface: Audio, video, and tracking information is transmitted through the VFX1 Headgear Interface Protocol (VIP) board, a 16-bit ISA card that receives video input from the video card's 26-pin VESA feature connector and routes audio signals to the sound card's line in/out through external 1/8" audio jacks. Audio, video, and tracking data is exchanged with the headset over a single proprietary 8-foot cable, which can be daisy-chained for improved mobility.

== System requirements ==
- IBM-Compatible PC with 386 CPU
- VGA video card with 26-pin VESA feature connector
- 16-bit ISA expansion slot for VIP board
- MS-DOS 5.0 or later
- 500 KB free hard-drive space for drivers and utilities
- 20 KB conventional memory for drivers
- Optional: stereo sound card
