= Zoomed video port =

Unidirectional video bus allowing laptops to display real-time video

In computing, a zoomed video port (often simply ZV port) is a unidirectional video bus allowing a device in a PC card slot to transfer video data directly into a VGA frame buffer, so as to allow laptops to display real-time video. The standard was created by the PCMCIA to allow devices such as TV tuners, video inputs and MPEG coprocessors to fit into a PC card form factor and provide a cheap solution for both the laptop manufacturer and consumer.

The ZV port is a direct connection between the PC card slot and VGA controller. Video data is transferred in real time without any buffering, removing the need for bus mastering or arbitration.

The ZV port was invented as an alternative to such methods as the VAFC (VESA Advanced Feature connector).
