= Liquid Image =

Canadian head-mounted display manufacturer

- Industry: Head-mounted display
- Founded: 1992
- Defunct: 1997
- Fate: Rebranded as TekGear
- Headquarters: Winnipeg, Canada

Liquid Image Corporation was a Winnipeg-based company that manufactured head-mounted displays. The company formed in 1992 by Tony Havelka, David Collette and Shannon O'Brien. Liquid Image was started in Winnipeg, MB in response to the emergence of a market for virtual reality technology. Funding as provided by a group of local angels and the first office was in the attic of Tony Havelka.

== Products ==
The company focused their efforts on creation of a commercially available head-mounted display (HMD) system for military, scientific and entertainment uses. The first product, the MRG2, was a monocular HMD that used a 5.7" diagonal colour TFT-LCD. After conducting ergonomic research on head sizes at the University of Manitoba and evaluating market potential the MRG2 was created as a universal fit design. Within 15 months Liquid Image had sold more than $1.1 million of MRG2 units at a price of $6800 per HMD. The design won the 1994 Mecklermedia Virtual Reality award. Jaron Lanier, a VR pioneer, commented that year at a tradeshow where the founders met him that he liked the monocular design of the MRG2. He also commented that he would have created a monocular system at VPL Research if a suitable display had been available. By 1996 the MRG2.2 product was available for $3495.

Other HMD designs includes an upgraded MRG2 called the MRG3C and MRG4. The MRG3, sold for$5500, used the identical HMD design but used a TFT-LCD with six times the resolution of the MRG2. The MRG4, sold for $2199, was a completely new design targeted at companies developing virtual reality (VR) game systems. The MRG4 was sold for $2800. As a result of the demand for VR game systems Liquid Image developed their own system by partnering with a company in Vancouver, BC that had developed their own graphic engine. The game system could also a popular PC game at the time, Duke Nukem, as the basis of a multiplayer immersive game. MRG2 HMDs were used in game systems used in Disney World, in an Aerosmith music video ("Amazing") and several low-budget "B" movies that went straight to video. The MRG2 is cited in patents.

In 1995 David Collette and Tony Havelka were finalists in the Manitoba Entrepreneur of the Year coming second. They both were featured in Economic Development television commercials showcasing local companies developing high technology products.

== Expansion ==
Liquid Image expanded the use of the components of the game system to commercial applications including tourism, military training, astronaut training and scientific studies. By 1996 the VR market showed itself as a "bubble market" that was quickly disappearing. Liquid Image realized that integrated, immerse virtual reality technology was not commercially viable as a consumer product. However, two non-consumer markets were identified as sustainable: military/science, wearable computers. Liquid Image announced they would begin a new division to focus on portable computing for use in military and commercial applications. Liquid Image HMDs were used in developing rapid prototyping systems. In 1992 they had been given a prototype version of the Apple Newton for use in evaluating how HMD systems could be used as the interface. At that time the display technology required for a wearable computer was not available and no further work was completed. However, by 1996 there were many commercially available displays available that could be used in development of commercial and military wearable computing systems.

A book called "Virtual Reality Systems for Business", by Robert Thierauf called the MRG2 "well-suited to game and heavy-duty applications".

The MRG5 product was released in 1996 and was the first Liquid Glass product to use dual LCD displays. Liquid glass did not launch the product commercially.

In 1997, Liquid Image launched the MRG6 monocular system into the wearable computing market. It became one of the first commercially available wearable computing displays and has since been developed into further products, such as Google Glass. That fall, the next monocle, the award-winning M1, was released.

== Rebranding ==
By 1997, the demand for VR game systems had almost stopped and the company had not shifted sufficiently to sustainable revenue from sales of wearable computing devices. The original company was sold and was rebranded "TekGear" becoming mostly a reseller of other virtual reality and wearable computing technology. Both David Collette and Shannon O'Brien had left Liquid Image prior to the transition to "TekGear" while Tony Havelka continued to manage and grow TekGear.

== Cultural impact ==
Liquid Image products have made appearances in pop culture. In 1995, a low-budget film called "Evolver" used the MRG2 as the head mounted display. A 1997 book, "Training's Future?: Perspectives on Virtual Reality and Related Emerging Technologies (Defense Research Series)" by Robert Siedel describes the system developed by the Royal Canadian Navy to train naval officers on how to be the officer on watch for ships at sea.

In 2014, Verge Magazine published an article on "The State of Virtual Reality" and the front image of the article was the MRG2.
