= Feature connector =

Internal connector used in older graphics cards

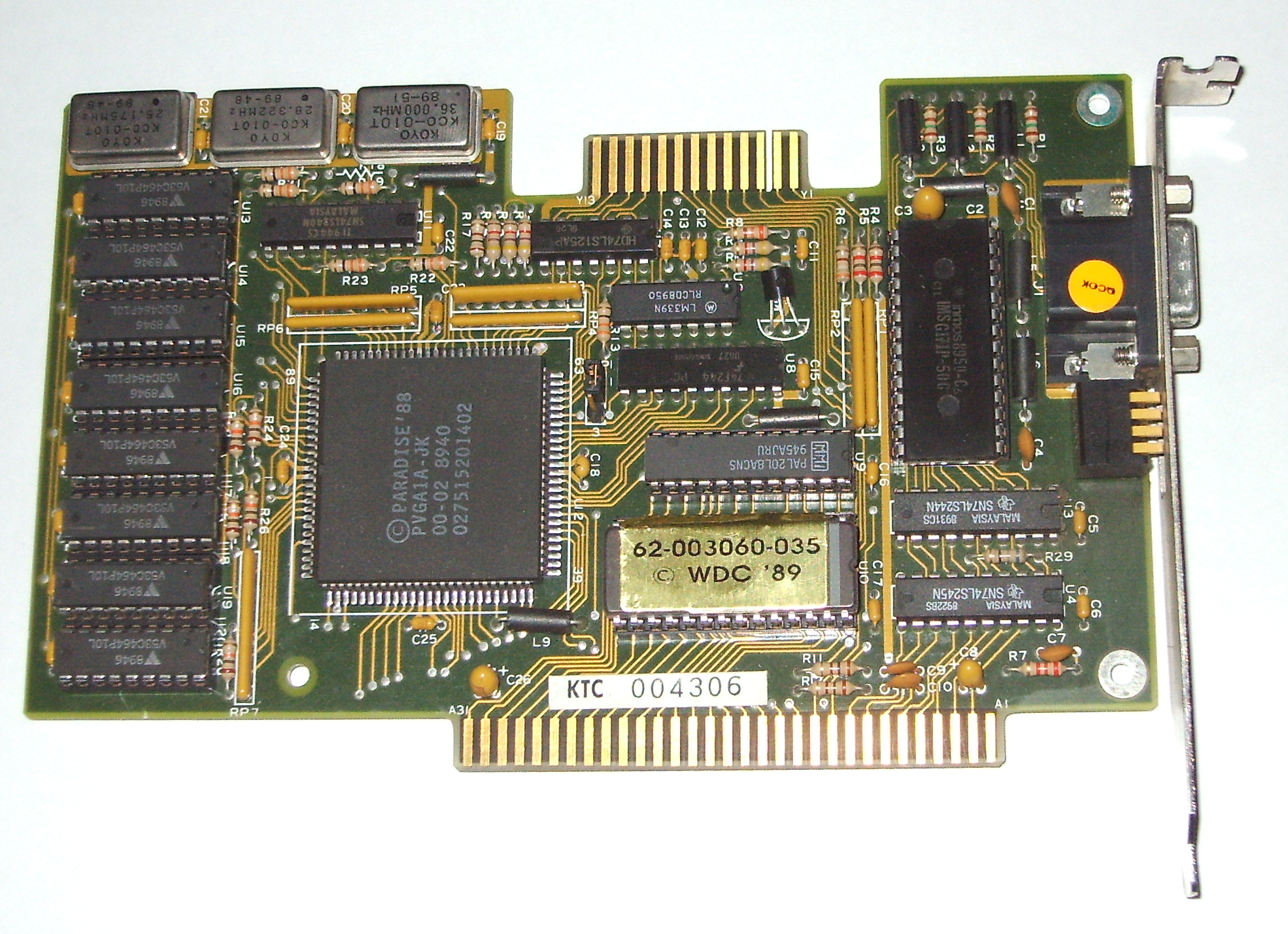
Paradise Systems 8-bit ISA video card with feature connector (on the top)

The feature connector was an internal connector found mostly in some older ISA, VESA Local Bus, and PCI graphics cards, but also on some early AGP ones. It was intended for use by devices that needed to exchange large amounts of data with the graphics card without hogging a computer system's CPU or data bus, such as TV tuner cards, video capture cards, MPEG video decoders (e.g. SGS Thomson MPEG Decoder), and first generation 3D graphic accelerator cards. Early examples include the IBM EGA video adapter.

Several standards existed for feature connectors, depending on the bus and graphics card type. Most of them were simply an 8, 16 or 32-bit wide internal connector, transferring data between the graphics card and another device, bypassing the system's CPU and memory completely.

Their speeds often far exceeded the speed of normal ISA or even early PCI buses, e.g. 40 MB/s for a standard ISA-based SVGA, up to 150 MB/s for a VESA-based or PCI-based one, while the standard 16 bit ISA bus ran at ~5.3 MB/s and the VESA bus at up to 160 MB/s bandwidth. The feature connector bandwidths were far beyond the capabilities of e.g. a 386, 486 and barely handled by an early Pentium.

Depending on the implementation, it could be uni or bi-directional, and carry analog color information as well as data. Unlike analog overlay devices however, a feature connector carried mainly data and essentially allowed an expansion card to access the graphics card Video RAM directly, although directing this data stream to the system's CPU and RAM was not always possible, limiting its usefulness mainly to display purposes.

Although its use rapidly declined after the introduction of the faster AGP internal bus, it was, at its time, the only feasible way to connect certain types of graphics-intensive devices to an average computing system without exceeding the available CPU power and memory bandwidth, and without the disadvantages and limitations of a purely analog overlay.

The idea of accessing a video card's memory directly resurfaced with the introduction of the Scan-Line Interleave (3dfx SLI) technology, although this technology is aimed at connecting two equally powered and complete graphic cards to produce a single, increased performance visual output, and not e.g. directly interfacing TV tuner cards.

== PCMCIA card ==
A variant of that idea, born for PCMCIA Card, is named Zoomed video port.
