= Vuzix =

American multinational technology

Vuzix Corporation
- Type: Public
- Traded as: Nasdaq: VUZI; Russell 2000 Component
- Founder: Paul Travers
- Headquarters: Rochester, New York, United States
- Products: Blade Smart Glasses, M400 Smart Glasses, LX1 Smart Glasses, OEM reference platforms
- Owner: Intel (10%); State Street KOMP ETF (12%)
- Number of employees: 90
- Website: www.vuzix.com

Vuzix Corporation (/ˈvjuzɪks/) is an American multinational technology company headquartered in Rochester, New York and founded by Paul Travers in 1997. Vuzix is a supplier of smartglasses and augmented reality display technology. Vuzix manufactures and sells computer display devices and software. Vuzix head-mounted displays are marketed towards mobile and immersive augmented reality applications, such as 3D gaming, manufacturing training, and military tactical equipment. On January 5, 2015, Intel acquired 30% of Vuzix's stock for $24.8 million.

The company has offices in New York, Japan, and the UK and is the current market leader for video eyewear. Forte was a pioneer during the mid-1990s developing immersive head mounted displays for virtual reality and video gaming applications.

Vuzix's displays are based on optical waveguides.

== History ==
Paul Travers founded Vuzix in 1997 in Rochester, NY, under the name Interactive Imaging Systems, purchasing the assets of the virtual reality company Forte Technologies. The company started with products for the military and U.S. Defense, but then developed consumer virtual reality systems. In 1997, the company was hired as a subcontractor to Raytheon, designing display electronics for a digital night vision weapon sight.

In 2000, the VFX1 Headgear was featured in a commemorative US Postal Service stamp collection celebrating the 1990s. The VFX1 was replaced by a higher resolution system dubbed the VFX3D in mid 2000.

In 2001, Vuzix launched its first consumer electronics product, the iCOM personal internet browser.

In 2005, Vuzix provided a custom high resolution handheld display system that created the 3D imagery for Hitachi's pavilion at the 2005 World's Fair in Aichi, Japan. The Hitachi Pavilion allowed users to interact with computer generated models and dioramas of endangered species in a Mixed Reality ride.

In 2005, the company changed its name to Icuiti. Later that year, Icuiti launched its first product designed specifically for consumers, the V920 Video Eyewear.

In 2005, Icuiti was awarded its first military R&D contract to develop a high resolution monocular display device for viewing tactical maps and video. This development would lead to the Tac-Eye product line, which began rate production in 2009 and was used in many major military programs including the Battlefield Air Operations kit.

A re-branding in 2007 changed the company's name from Icuiti to Vuzix.

In 2010, Vuzix introduced the first production model see-through augmented reality glasses, the STAR 1200. It was released in August 2011 for $4999.

Vuzix was under contract with DARPA to design and build a next generation heads up display for military ground personnel.

In January 2013, at CES, Vuzix Corporation demonstrated working models of its new M100 Smart Glasses. The product was given a CES Innovations award. The Vuzix Smart Glasses M100, shipped in the first financial quarter of 2013, enabled wearers to remotely access data and content from an iOS or Android smartphone.

In January 2015, Intel invested $25 million in the company, gaining 30% ownership of the company.

In August 2017, Vuzix and BlackBerry became partners to deliver smart glasses for the enterprise.

== Innovations ==
=== Video Eyewear ===
- Vuzix created the first video eyewear to support stereoscopic 3D for the PlayStation 3 and Xbox 360.

=== Augmented Reality Eyewear ===
- In 2010, Vuzix showcased the first commercially produced pass-through augmented reality headset, the Wrap 920AR. The Wrap 920AR was equipped with two VGA video displays and two cameras that provided a live view of the surrounding environment.
- During the Consumer Electronic Show in 2011, Vuzix announced their transparent AR display prototype, codenamed Raptyr. It was intended to be the first product of its kind. It was never officially released under the Raptyr name, instead being sold as the STAR 1200. The prototype received a CES Innovation Award in 2011.
- The STAR 1200 was the first mass-produced augmented reality system with a transparent display. It was intended to mimic glasses, and was able to fit over a user's own eyewear in lieu of offering prescription lenses. The display was connected to a user's computer via a VGA or DVI cable.
- The Vuzix Smart Glasses M100 were commercially released in early 2013. Unlike previous models, the M100 was able to wirelessly connect to mobile devices, and came with an on-board Android OS.

== See also ==
- MyVu
