= HMZ-T1 =

Head mounted stereoscopic display by Sony Corporation

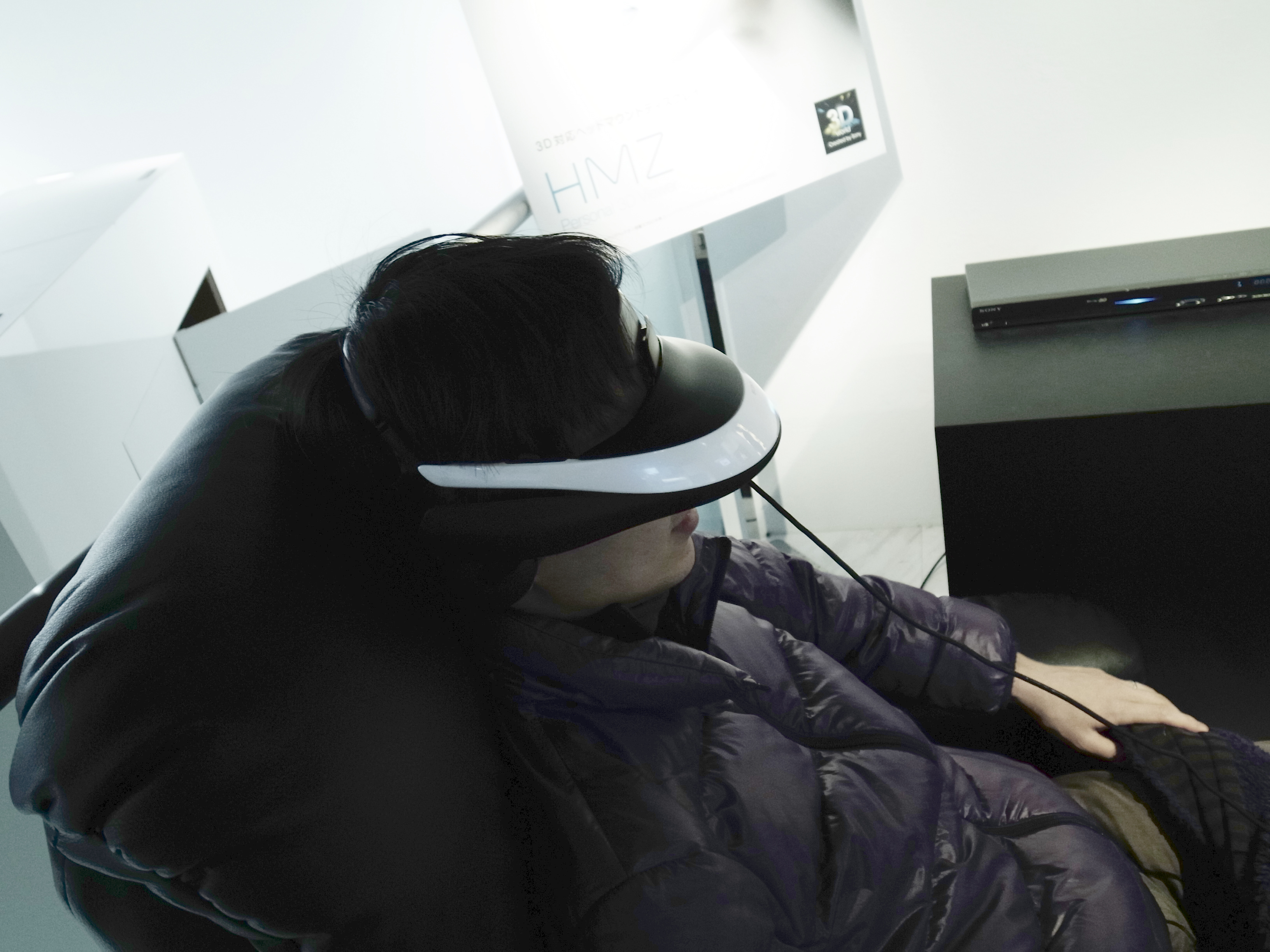
A person wearing a Sony HMZ-T1.

The HMZ-T1 is a visor style head mounted display manufactured by Sony Corporation in 2011. It allows the user to view stereoscopic 3D imagery. Also known as the Sony Personal HD & 3D Viewer, the HMZ-T1 is composed of two different hardware devices, the Visor and the External Processor Unit.

== Visor ==
The visor consists of 2 miniature OLED displays providing video and headphones providing stereo sound. The two displays can be driven independently and offer stereoscopic video when used with a compatible video format.

=== Specifications ===
The following specifications apply to the Visor portion of the HMZ-T1.

Make	Sony
Model	HMZ-T1
Class	head mounted display
Display Technology	OLED
Display Resolution	1280 x 720 (per eye)
Brightness	200 cd/m²
Contrast	10,000:1
Response time	0.01 ms
Image persistence	16.67 ms
Horizontal FOV	45°
Diagonal FOV	51.6°
Video Input	Proprietary (Video + Audio + Power)
Video Modes	Standard / Cinema / Dynamic / Custom
Video Adjustments	IPD
Cable Length	3.5 m
Headphone Type	(2) Foam Covered Audio Drivers
Mass	420 g
Dimensions	210 mm × 126 mm × 257 mm (including headband)
Estimated Street Price (Visor + External Processor Unit)	~60000¥ (Japan); ~$799 (USA); ~7500 kr (Sweden); ~799 € (France)
Availability	2011-11

=== Fit ===
The visor is worn on the head and kept in place using a combination of a headband and a forehead cushion. Sony has produced a short video detailing the method for getting an accurate fit when using the HMZ-T1: How to use Sony Personal 3D Viewer Headset

== External Processor Unit ==
=== Specifications ===
The following specifications apply to the External Processor portion of the HMZ-T1.

Make	Sony
Model	HMZ-T1
Class	head mounted display
Video Input	HDMI 1.4a Compliant
Video Passthrough	HDMI 1.4a Compliant
Video Output	Proprietary (Video + Audio + Power)
Sound Processing	Simulated 5.1 Surround Sound
Sound Modes	Standard / Cinema / Game / Music
Dimensions	180 mm × 36 mm × 168 mm
Mass	600 g

== Reviews ==
It has been reviewed by CNET, CNN, PC Mag, and Time.
