= Sunglasses =

Eyewear for protecting against bright light

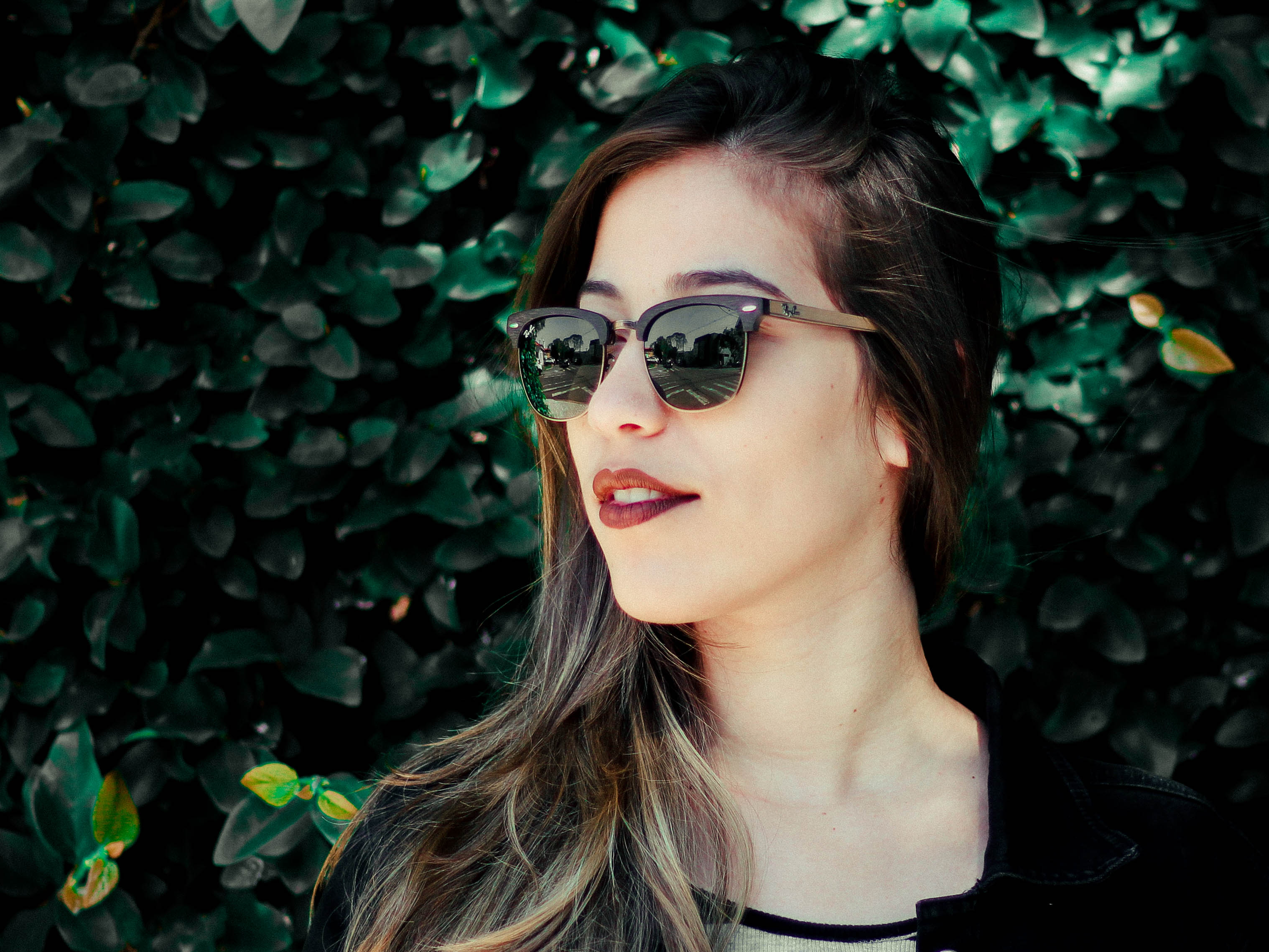
Wearing sunglasses under direct sunlight: Large lenses offer good protection, but broad temple arms are also needed against "stray light" from the sides.

Sunglasses or sun glasses (informally called shades or sunnies; more names below) are a form of protective eyewear designed primarily to prevent bright sunlight and high-energy visible light from damaging or discomforting the eyes. They can sometimes also function as a visual aid, as variously termed spectacles or glasses exist, featuring lenses that are colored, polarized or darkened. In the early 20th century, they were also known as sun cheaters (cheaters then being an American slang term for glasses).

Since the 1930s, sunglasses have been a popular fashion accessory, especially on the beach.

The American Optometric Association recommends wearing sunglasses that block ultraviolet radiation (UV) whenever a person is in the sunlight to protect the eyes from UV and blue light, which can cause several serious eye problems. Their usage is mandatory immediately after some surgical procedures, such as LASIK, and recommended for a certain time period in dusty areas, when leaving the house and in front of a TV screen or computer monitor after LASEK. Dark glasses that do not block UV radiation can be more damaging to the eyes than not wearing eye protection at all, because they tend to open the pupil and allow more UV rays into the eye.

== History ==
=== First precursors ===
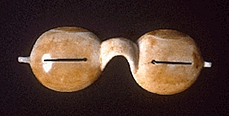
Inuit snow goggles function by reducing exposure to sunlight, not by reducing its intensity.

Since the 13th century and until the spread of contemporary UV-shielding spectacles against snowblindness, Inuit made and wore snow goggles of flattened walrus or caribou ivory with narrow slits to look through to block almost all of the harmful reflected rays of the sun. In many different forms and with many different materials, the indigenous peoples of North America and northern Asia crafted highly efficient equipment to protect their eyes against the damaging effects of strong sunlight in icy circumstances.

=== Other precursors ===
Pliny the Elder claimed that the Roman emperor Nero liked to watch gladiator fights using cut emeralds. These, however, appear to have worked rather like mirrors.

The first sunglasses, made from flat panes of smoky quartz called Ai Tai (靉靆), meaning "dark clouds," which offered no corrective powers but did protect the eyes from glare, were used in China in the 12th century or possibly earlier. Documents describe the use of such crystal sunglasses by judges in ancient Chinese courts to conceal their facial expressions while questioning witnesses.

In 1459, Nuno Fernandes made a request for a pair of spectacles to protect the eyes while horseriding in the snow against the glare coming from the snow, though no description of any actual spectacles is given.

King Louis XIV's court watched the 1706 solar eclipse through a telescope with a smoky glass filter attached.

By the 18th century, tinted, mirror-like framed Murano glasses had been used as so-called "gondola glasses" (vetri da gondola and also da dama) by Venetian women and children, to shield their eyes from the glare from the water in the canals. The Doge and other well-off Venetians, such as possibly Goldoni, sported, in the late 18th century, so-called "goldoni glasses," tinted pairs of spectacles with pieces of cloth as sun guards on the sides of the glasses.

James Ayscough began experimenting with tinted lenses in spectacles around 1752. These were not "sunglasses" as that term is now used; Ayscough believed that blue- or green-tinted glass could correct for specific vision impairments. Protection from the sun's rays was not a concern for him.

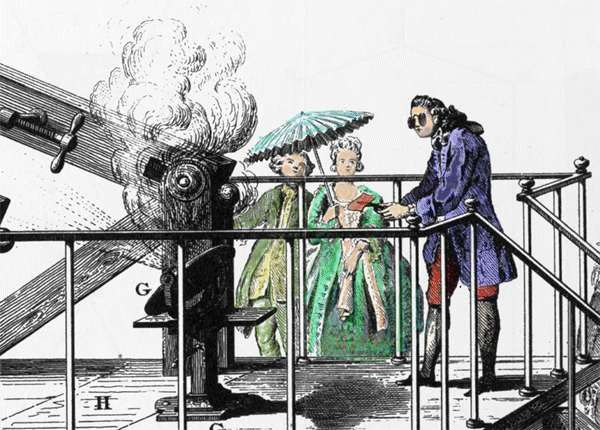
Antoine Lavoisier conducting an experiment related to combustion generated by amplified sun light

One of the earliest surviving depictions of a person wearing sunglasses is one from 1772 of the scientist Antoine Lavoisier, who worked with amplified sunlight. By the 19th century, tinted spectacles were worn by railway travelers.

Popularly, it is claimed that yellow/amber and brown-tinted glasses had been used to alleviate symptoms of syphilis in the 19th and early 20th centuries, because sensitivity to light was one of the symptoms of the disease, although no sources have been found that state prescription of such.

From the late 19th century, short references of sunglasses have been found in reports, such as one from 1866 by Walter Alden, who wrote of soldiers using, during the American Civil War (1861–1865), "shell spectacles" ("verres de cocquille") to protect against sunlight on long marches, or by the British T. Longmore reporting in The Optical Manual (1885) of soldiers in Egypt being equipped with tinted glass "eye protectors." By 1895, sunglasses were mentioned in advertisements, such as in The Sioux City Journal.

=== Modern developments ===
Jean-Marie-Théodore Fieuzal (1836–1888) was the first to argue for UV protection with (yellow) shaded glasses, and by 1899, Rodenstock GmbH produced possibly the first sunglasses intended for shielding eyes from UV light and not just glare.

In 1913, Crookes lenses were introduced, made from glass containing cerium, which completely blocked ultraviolet light. In the early 1920s, the use of sunglasses started to become more widespread, especially among movie stars. Inexpensive mass-produced sunglasses made from celluloid were first produced by Sam Foster in 1929. Foster found a ready market on the beaches of Atlantic City, New Jersey where he began selling sunglasses under the name Foster Grant from a Woolworth on the Boardwalk. By 1938, Life magazine wrote of how sunglasses were a "new fad for wear on city streets ... a favorite affectation of thousands of women all over the U.S." It stated that 20 million sunglasses were sold in the United States in 1937 but estimated that only about 25% of American wearers needed them to protect their eyes. At the same time, sunglasses started to be used as aids for pilots and even produced for the gaining aviation sector, eventually adding to sunglasses as cultural icons and to their popularity. Polarized sunglasses first became available in 1936 when Edwin H. Land began experimenting with making lenses with his patented Polaroid filter. In 1947, the Armorlite Company began producing lenses with CR-39 resin.

As of 2008, Xiamen, China, was the world's largest producer of sunglasses with its port exporting 120 million pairs each year.

== Functions ==
Effect of pair of polarized filters

=== Visual clarity and comfort ===
Sunglasses can improve visual comfort and visual clarity by protecting the eye from glare.

The lenses of polarized sunglasses reduce glare reflected at some angles off shiny non-metallic surfaces, such as water. They allow wearers to see into water when only surface glare would otherwise be seen, and eliminate glare from a road surface when driving into the sun.

=== Protection ===
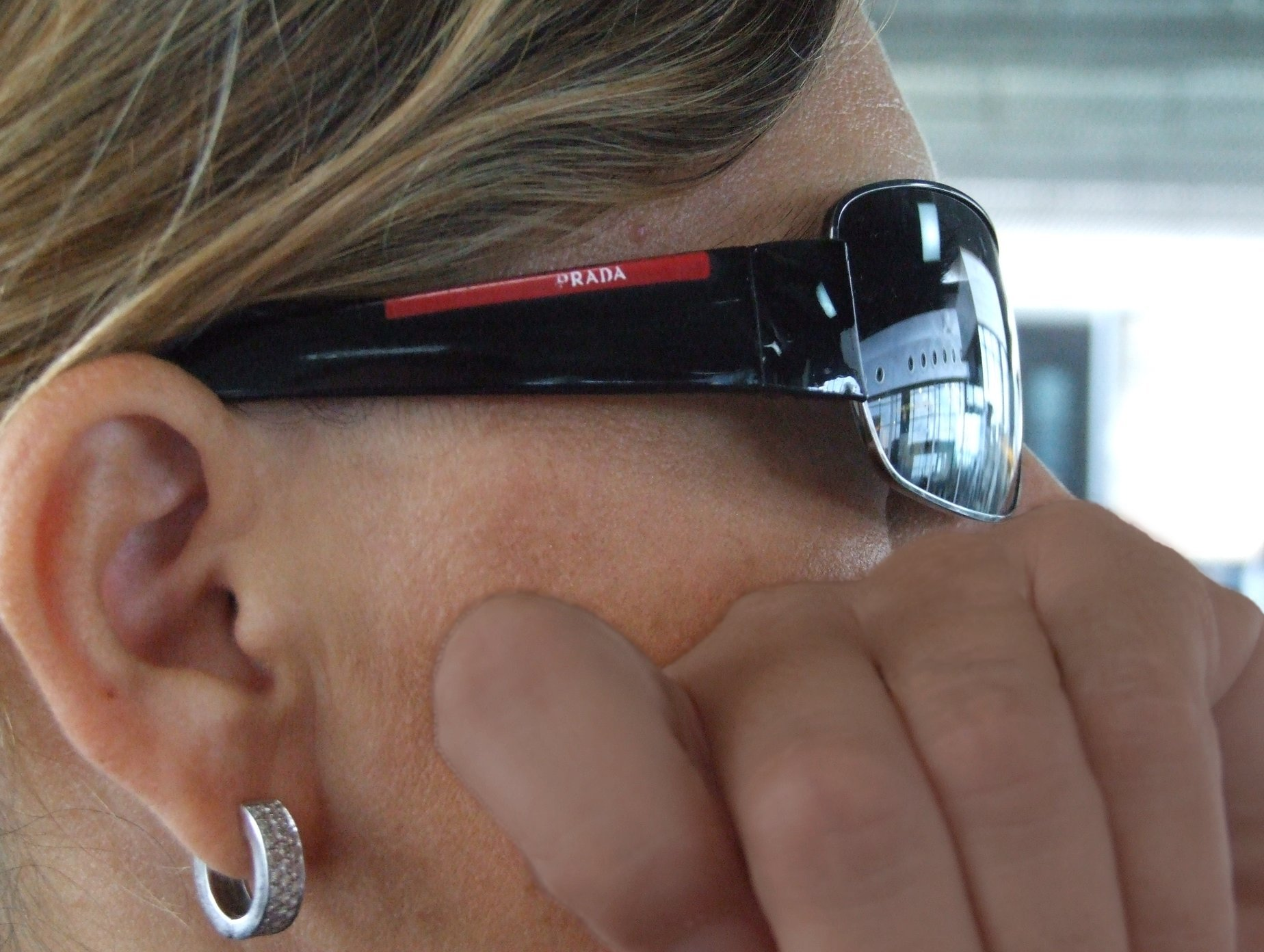
Broad temple arms protect against "stray light" entering from the sides.

Sunglasses offer protection against excessive exposure to light, including its visible and invisible components.

The most widespread protection is against ultraviolet radiation, which can cause short-term and long-term ocular problems such as photokeratitis (snow blindness), cataracts, pterygium, and various forms of eye cancer. Medical experts advise the public on the importance of wearing sunglasses to protect the eyes from UV; for adequate protection, experts recommend sunglasses that reflect or filter out 99% or more of UVA and UVB light, with wavelengths up to 400 nm. Sunglasses that meet this requirement are often labeled as "UV400". This is slightly more protection than the widely used standard of the European Union (see below), which requires that 95% of the radiation up to only 380 nm must be reflected or filtered out. Sunglasses are not sufficient to protect the eyes against permanent harm from looking directly at the Sun, even during a solar eclipse. Special eyewear known as solar viewers are required for direct viewing of the sun. This type of eyewear can filter out UV radiation harmful to the eyes.

More recently, high-energy visible light (HEV) has been implicated as a cause of age-related macular degeneration; before, debates had already existed as to whether "blue blocking" or amber tinted lenses may have a protective effect. Some manufacturers already design glasses to block blue light; the insurance company Suva, which covers most Swiss employees, asked eye experts around Charlotte Remé (ETH Zürich) to develop norms for blue blocking, leading to a recommended minimum of 95% of the blue light. Sunglasses are especially important for children, as their ocular lenses are thought to transmit far more HEV light than adults (lenses "yellow" with age).

==== Assessing protection ====
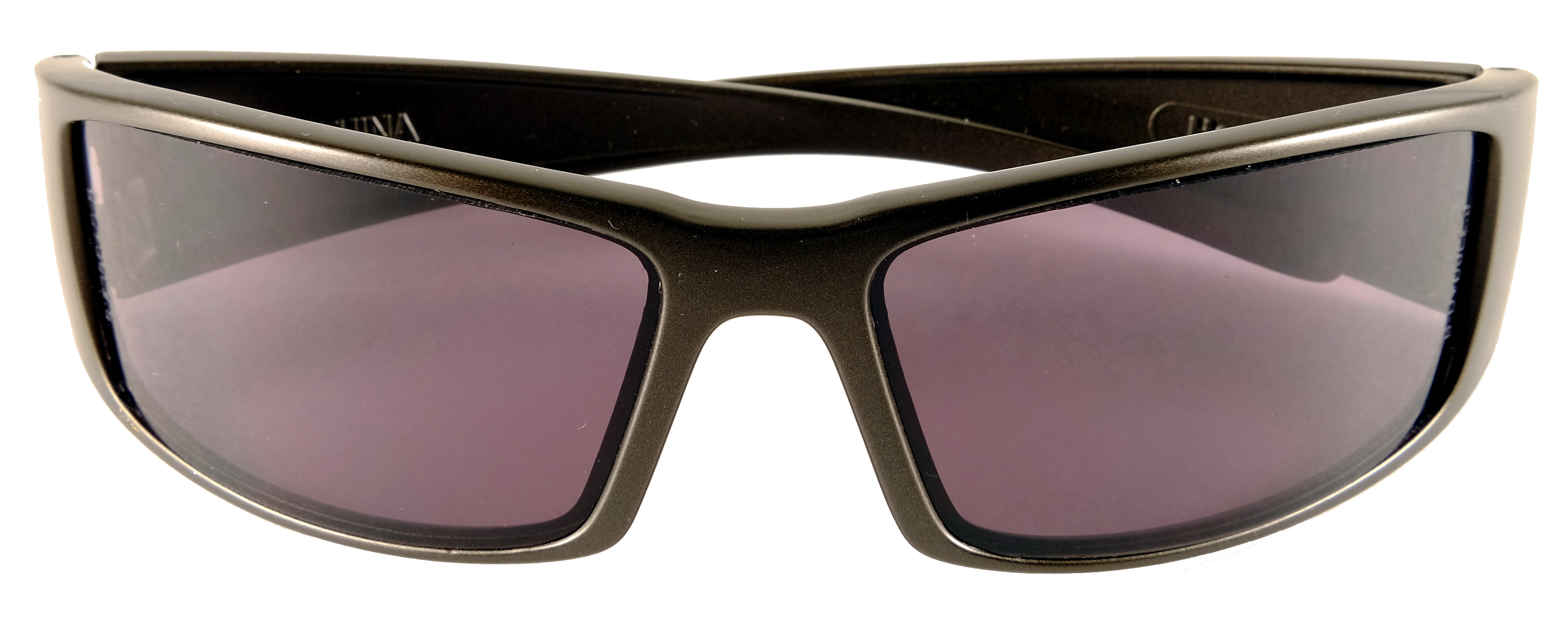
These safety sunglasses have a scratch resistant coating, block 99.9% UV, and meet ANSI Z87.1 and CSA Z94.3 standards.

The only way to assess the protection of sunglasses is to have the lenses measured, either by the manufacturer or by a properly equipped optician. Several standards for sunglasses (see below) allow a general classification of the UV protection (but not the blue light protection), and manufacturers often indicate simply that the sunglasses meet the requirements of a specific standard rather than publish the exact figures.

One "visible" quality test for sunglasses is their fit. The lenses should fit close enough to the face that only very little "stray light" can reach the eye from their sides, or from above or below, but not so close that the eyelashes smear the lenses. To protect against "stray light" from the sides, the lenses should fit close enough to the temples or merge into broad temple arms or leather blinders. Another test is for lenses said to be polarising: having two such lenses, they should block all light when after each other with one pair turned 90°.

It is not possible to "see" the protection that sunglasses offer. Dark lenses do not automatically filter out more harmful UV radiation and blue light than light lenses. Inadequate dark lenses are even more harmful than inadequate light lenses (or wearing no sunglasses at all) because they provoke the pupil to open wider. As a result, more unfiltered radiation enters the eye. Depending on the manufacturing technology, sufficiently protective lenses can block much or little light, resulting in dark or light lenses. The lens color is not a guarantee either. Lenses of various colors can offer sufficient (or insufficient) UV protection. Regarding blue light, the color gives at least a first indication: Blue blocking lenses are commonly yellow or brown, whereas blue or gray lenses cannot offer the necessary blue light protection. However, not every yellow or brown lens blocks sufficient blue light. In rare cases, lenses can filter out too much blue light (i.e., 100%), which affects color vision and can be dangerous in traffic when colored signals are not properly recognized.

High prices cannot guarantee sufficient protection as no correlation between high prices and increased UV protection has been demonstrated. A 1995 study reported that "Expensive brands and polarizing sunglasses do not guarantee optimal UVA protection." The Australian Competition & Consumer Commission has also reported that "[c]onsumers cannot rely on price as an indicator of quality". One survey even found that a $6.95 pair of generic glasses offered slightly better protection than expensive Salvatore Ferragamo shades.

=== Further functions ===
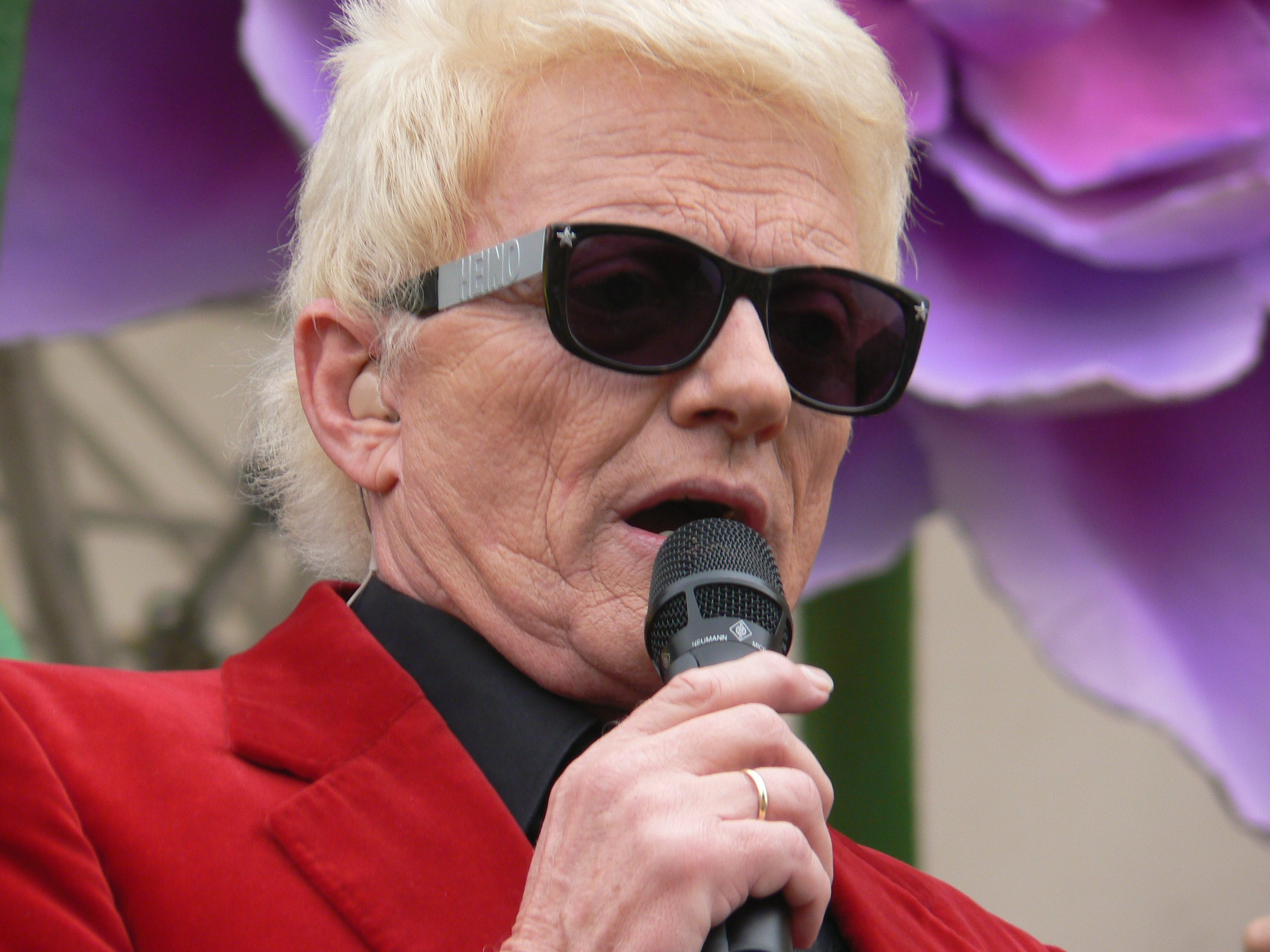
Protecting his eyes from exposure due to exophthalmos, sunglasses have become the trademark of German singer Heino.

While non-tinted glasses are very rarely worn without the practical purpose of correcting eyesight or protecting one's eyes, sunglasses have become popular for several further reasons, and are sometimes worn even indoors or at night.

Sunglasses can be worn to hide one's eyes. They can make eye contact impossible, which can be intimidating to those not wearing sunglasses; the avoided eye contact can also demonstrate the wearer's detachment, which is considered desirable (or "cool") in some circles. Eye contact can be avoided even more effectively by using mirrored sunglasses. Sunglasses can also be used to hide emotions; this can range from hiding blinking to hiding weeping and its resulting red eyes. In all cases, hiding one's eyes has implications for nonverbal communication; this is useful in poker, and many professional poker players wear heavily tinted glasses indoors while playing, so that it is more difficult for opponents to read tells which involve eye movement and thus gain an advantage.

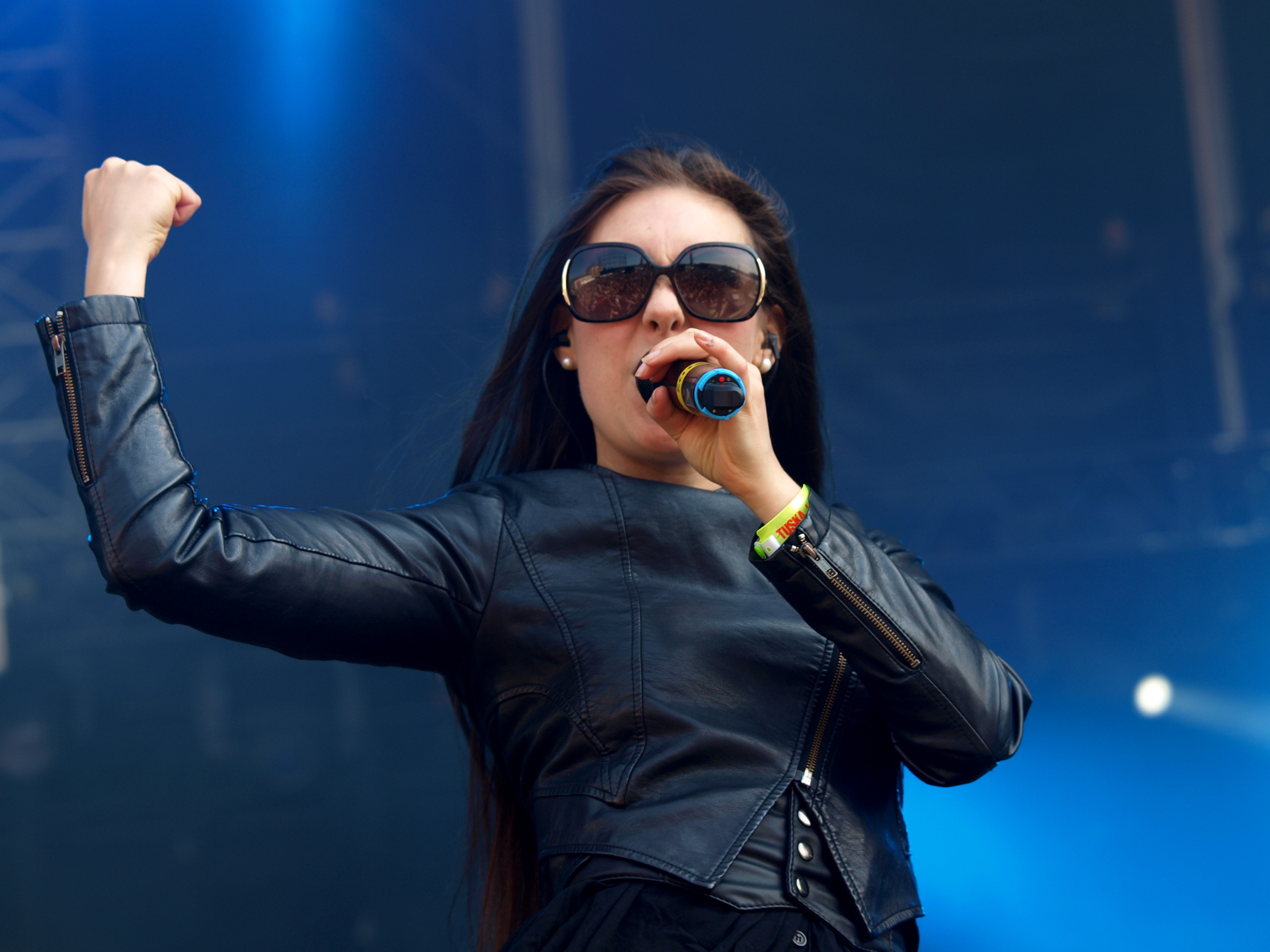
Artist Elize Ryd wearing sunglasses as part of her costume for the Tuska Open Air Metal Festival

Fashion trends can be another reason for wearing sunglasses, particularly designer sunglasses from high-end fashion brands. Sunglasses of particular shapes may be in vogue as a fashion accessory. The relevance of sunglasses within the fashion industry has included prominent fashion editors' reviews of annual trends in sunglasses as well as runway fashion shows featuring sunglasses as a primary or secondary component of a look. Fashion trends can also draw on the "cool" image of sunglasses and association with a particular lifestyle, especially the close connection between sunglasses and beach life. In some cases, this connection serves as the core concept behind an entire brand.

People may also wear sunglasses to hide an abnormal appearance of their eyes. This can be true for people with severe visual impairment, such as the blind, who may wear sunglasses to avoid making others uncomfortable. The assumption is that it may be more comfortable for another person not to see the hidden eyes rather than see abnormal eyes or eyes which seem to look in the wrong direction. People may also wear sunglasses to hide dilated or contracted pupils, bloodshot eyes due to drug use, chronic dark circles or crow's feet, recent physical abuse (such as a black eye), exophthalmos (bulging eyes), a cataract, or eyes which jerk uncontrollably (nystagmus).

Lawbreakers have been known to wear sunglasses during or after committing a crime as an aid to hiding their identities.

== Standards ==
The international standard for sunglasses is ISO 12312. It is divided into three parts, the first of them, about "Sunglasses for general use", was first published in 2013 and then with a new edition in 2022. The second, about "Filters for direct observation of the sun", was published in 2015 and the third "Sunglasses for running, cycling and similar active lifestyles" in 2022.

As of 2009, the European CE mark indicates that the glasses actually offer a certain level of sun protection.

=== Australia ===
Australia introduced the world's first national standards for sunglasses in 1971. They were updated and expanded in 1990 to AS 1067.1-1990 Sunglasses and fashion spectacles (incl. Part 1 Safety Requirements and Part 2 Performance Requirements), and replaced in 2003 by AS/NZS 1067:2003 Sunglasses and fashion spectacles. This aligned the Australian standard to the European standard opening the European market to Australian-made sunglasses. The Australian Standard AS-NZS 1067 defines standards for sunglasses with respect both to UVA (wavelengths between 315 nm and 400 nm) and UVB transmittance. The five ratings for transmittance (filter) under this standard are based on the amount of absorbed light, 0 to 4, with "0" providing some protection from UV radiation and sunglare, and "4" indicating a high level of protection, but not to be worn when driving.

=== Europe ===
The European standard EN 1836:2005 has four transmittance ratings: "0" for insufficient UV protection, "2" for sufficient UHV protection, "6" for good UHV protection and "7" for "full" UHVV protection, meaning that no more than 5% of the 380 nm rays are transmitted. Products which fulfill the standard receive a CE mark. There is no European rating for transmittance protection for radiation of up to 400 nm ("UV400"), as required in other countries (incl. the United States) and recommended by experts. The current European standard, EN 1836:2005, was preceded by the older standards EN 166:1995 (Personal eye protection – Specifications), EN167: 1995 (Personal eye protection – Optical test methods), and EN168: 1995 (Personal eye protection – Non-optical test methods), which in 2002 were republished as a revised standard under the name of EN 1836:1997 (which included two amendments). In addition to filtering, the standard also lists requirements for minimum robustness, labeling, materials (non-toxic for skin contact and not combustible) and lack of protrusions (to avoid harm when wearing them). Categories for the European standard, which are required to be marked on the frame:

- Category 0 – 80–100% transmission – for fashion, indoor use, or cloudy days
- Category 1 – 43–80% transmission – low sun exposure
- Category 2 – 18–43% transmission – medium sun exposure
- Category 3 – 8–18% transmission – strong brightness, light reflected of water or snow
- Category 4 – 3–8% transmission – intense sunshine for high mountains, glaciers; not for use when driving or on the road.

=== United States ===
Sunglasses sold in the United States are regulated by the Food and Drug Administration and are required to conform to safety standards. The U.S. standard is ANSI Z80.3-2001, which includes three transmittance categories. According to this standard, the lens should have a UVB (280 to 315 nm) transmittance of no more than one per cent and a UVA (315 to 380 nm) transmittance of no more than 0.3 times the visual light transmittance. The ANSI Z87.1-2003 standard includes requirements for basic impact and high impact protection. In the basic impact test, a 1 in (2.54 cm) steel ball is dropped on the lens from a height of 50 in (127 cm). In the high velocity test, a 1/4 in (6.35 mm) steel ball is shot at the lens at 150 ft/s (45.72 m/s). To pass both tests, no part of the lens may touch the eye.

== Special-use ==
=== Land vehicle driving ===
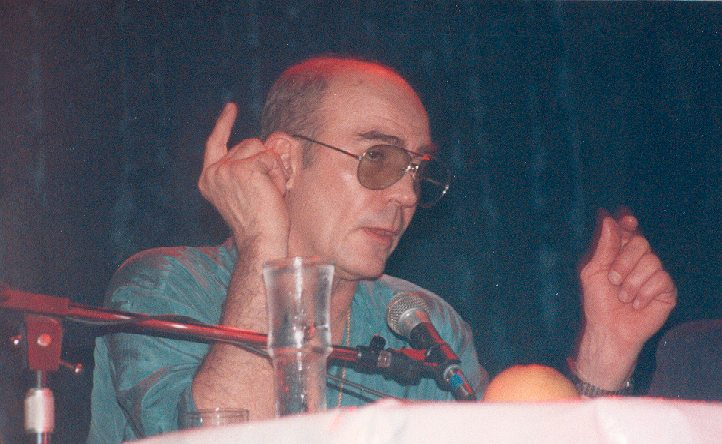
Hunter S. Thompson was known for wearing yellow-tinted driving glasses.

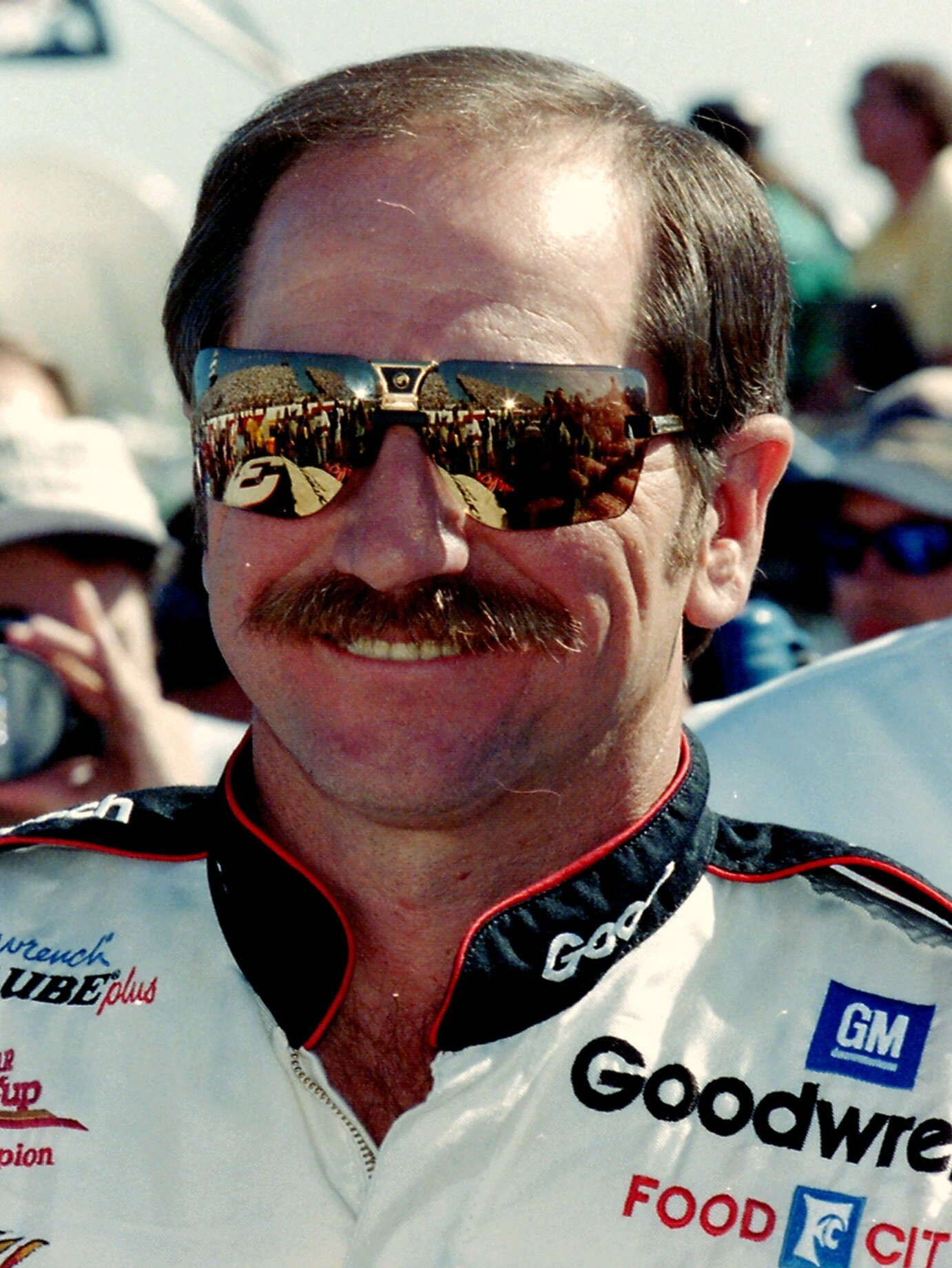
Dale Earnhardt wearing Gargoyles ANSI 85's sunglasses.

When driving a vehicle, particularly at high speed, dazzling glare caused by a low Sun, or by lights reflecting off snow, puddles, other vehicles, or even the front of the vehicle, can be lethal. Sunglasses can protect against glare when driving. Two criteria must be met: vision must be clear, and the glasses must let sufficient light get to the eyes for the driving conditions. General-purpose sunglasses may be too dark, or otherwise unsuitable for driving.

The Automobile Association and the Federation of Manufacturing Opticians have produced guidance for selection of sunglasses for driving. Variable tint or photochromic lenses increase their optical density when exposed to UV light, reverting to their clear state when the UV brightness decreases. Car windscreens filter out UV light, slowing and limiting the reaction of the lenses and making them unsuitable for driving as they could become too dark or too light for the conditions. Some manufacturers produce special photochromic lenses that adapt to the varying light conditions when driving.

Lenses of fixed tint are graded according to the optical density of the tint; in the UK sunglasses must be labelled and show the filter category number. Lenses with light transmission less than 75% are unsuitable for night driving, and lenses with light transmission less than 8% (category 4) are unsuitable for driving at any time; they should by UK law be labelled 'Not suitable for driving and road use'. Yellow tinted lenses are also not recommended for night use. Due to the light levels within the car, filter category 2 lenses which transmit between 18% and 43% of light are recommended for daytime driving. Polarised lenses normally have a fixed tint, and can reduce reflected glare more than non-polarised lenses of the same density, particularly on wet roads.

Graduated lenses, with the bottom part lighter than the top, can make it easier to see the controls within the car. All sunglasses should be marked as meeting the standard for the region where sold. An anti-reflection coating is recommended, and a hard coating to protect the lenses from scratches. Sunglasses with deep side arms can block side, or peripheral, vision and are not recommended for driving.

Even though some of these glasses are proven good enough for driving at night, it is strongly recommended not to do so, due to the changes in a wide variety of light intensities, especially while using yellow tinted protection glasses. The main purpose of these glasses are to protect the wearer from dust and smog particles entering into the eyes while driving at high speeds.

=== Aircraft piloting ===
Many of the criteria for sunglasses worn when piloting an aircraft are similar to those for land vehicles. Protection against UV radiation is more important, as its intensity increases with altitude. Polarised glasses are undesirable as aircraft windscreens are often polarised, intentionally or unintentionally, showing Moiré patterns on looking through the windscreen; and some LCDs used by instruments emit polarised light, and can dim or disappear when the pilot turns to look at them.

=== Sports ===
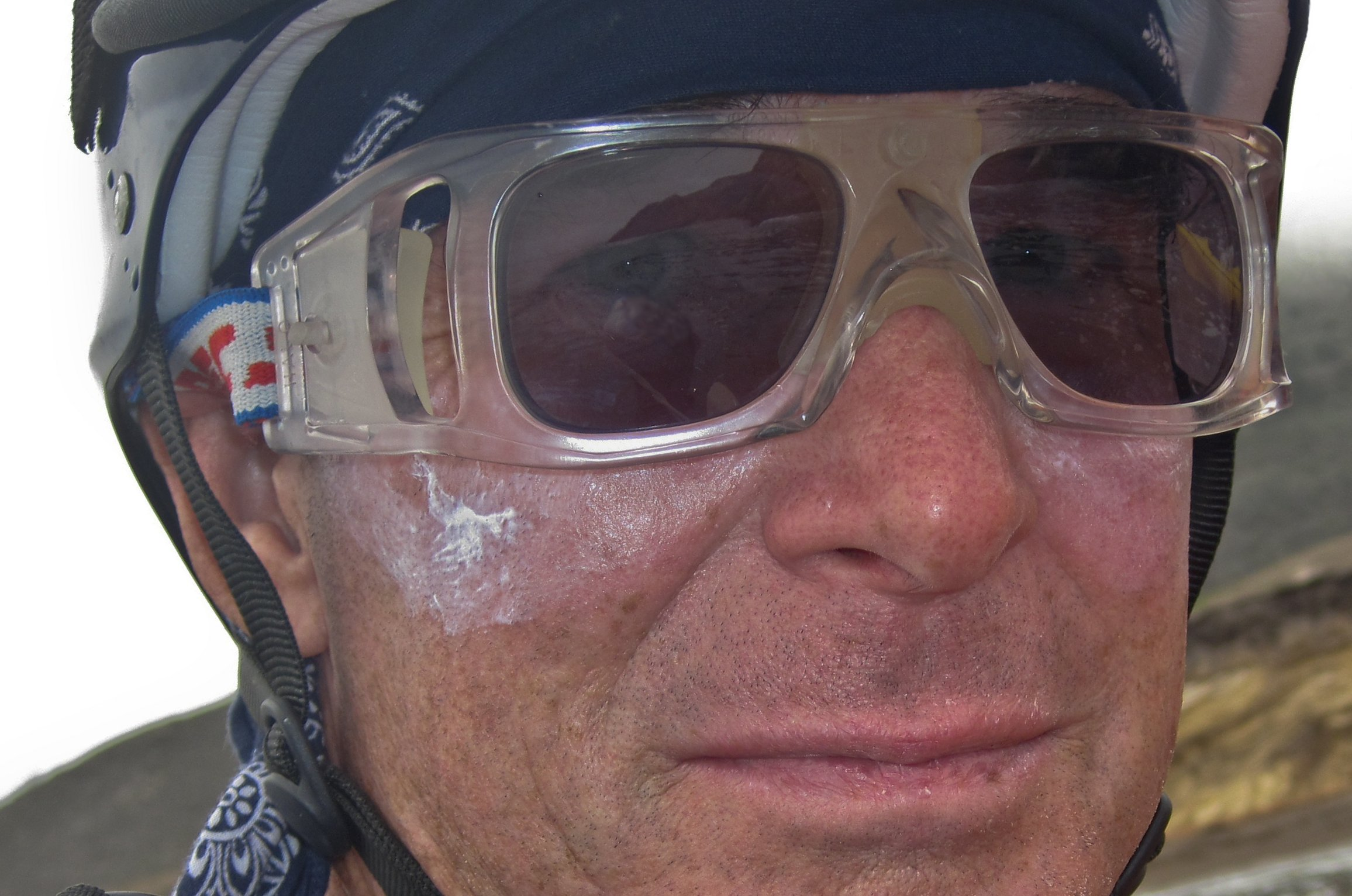
Sunglasses worn by an ocean kayaker

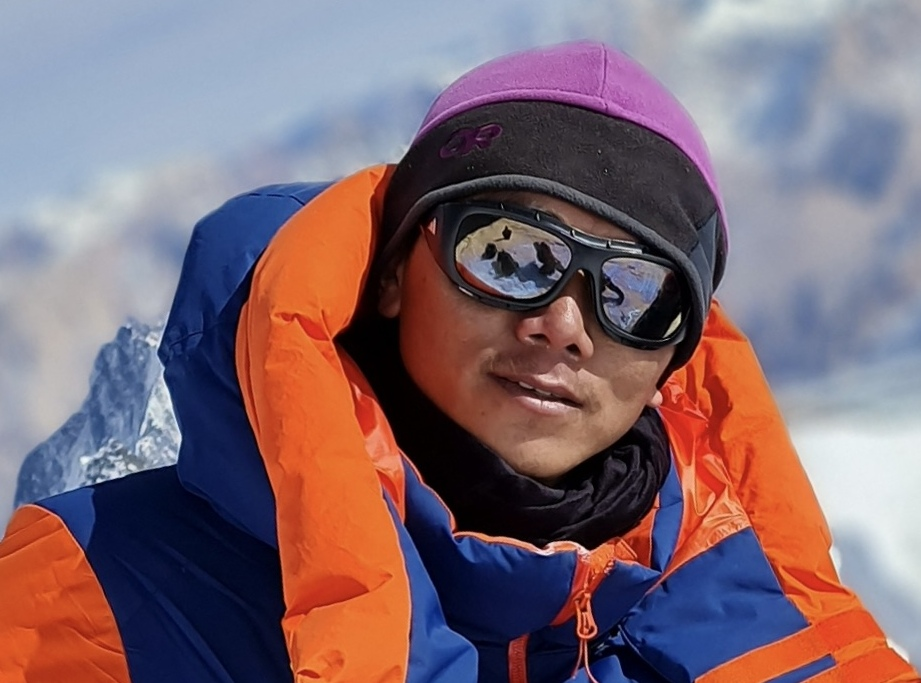
A Sherpa mountain guide on an expedition to K2 (8.611 m), wearing anatomically shaped mountaineering sunglasses

Like corrective glasses, sunglasses have to meet special requirements when worn for sports. They need shatterproof and impact-resistant lenses; a strap or other fixing is typically used to keep glasses in place during sporting activities, and they have a nose cushion.

For water sports, so-called water sunglasses (also: surf goggles or water eyewear) are specially adapted for use in turbulent water, such as the surf or whitewater. In addition to the features for sports glasses, water sunglasses can have increased buoyancy to stop them from sinking should they come off, and they can have a vent or other method to eliminate fogging.

Mountain climbing or traveling across glaciers or snowfields requires above-average eye protection, because sunlight (including ultraviolet radiation) is more intense in higher altitudes, and snow and ice reflect additional light. Popular glasses for this use are a type called glacier glasses or glacier goggles. They typically have very dark round lenses and leather blinders at the sides, which protect the eyes by blocking the Sun's rays around the edges of the lenses. What are Glacier Glasses?

Special shaded visors were once allowed in American football; Jim McMahon, quarterback for the Chicago Bears and San Diego Chargers, famously used a sun visor during his professional football career due to a childhood eye injury and almost always wears dark sunglasses when not wearing a football helmet. Darkened visors now require a doctor's prescription at most levels of the game, mainly because concussion protocol requires officials to look a player in the eye, something made difficult by tinted visors.

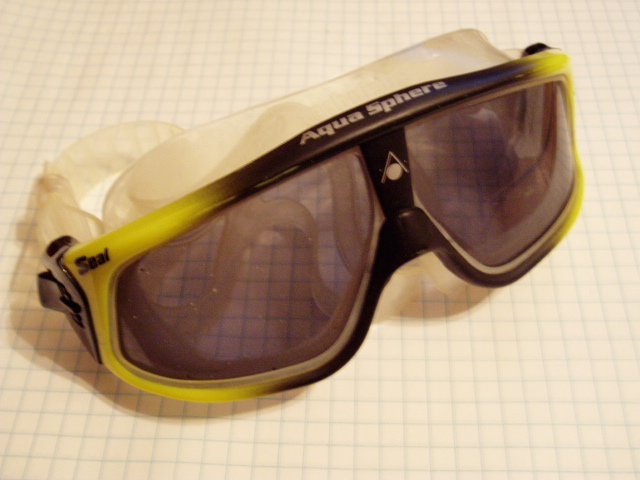
Swimming goggles

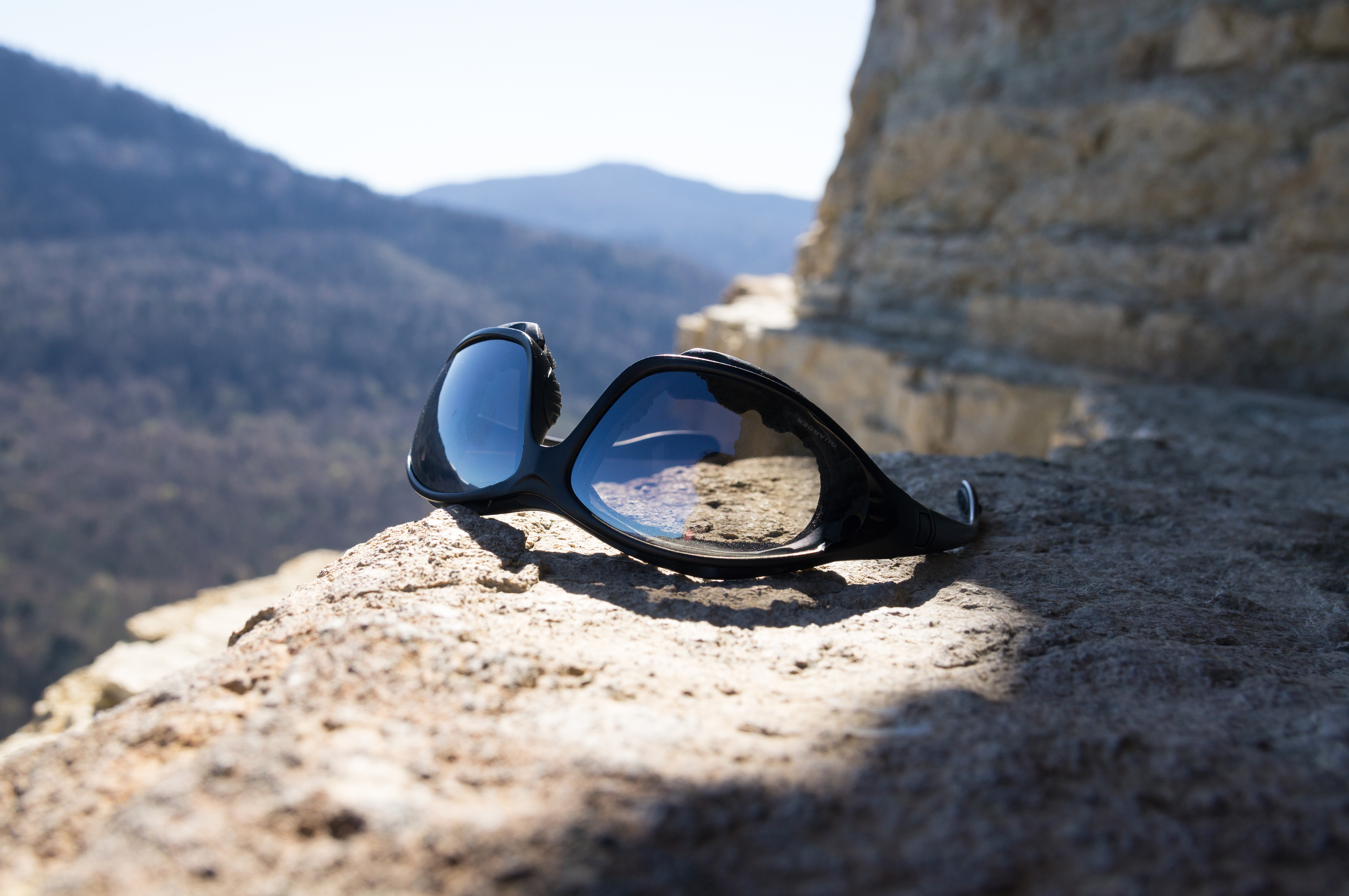
Sports sunglasses for mountain climbing and hiking

=== Space ===
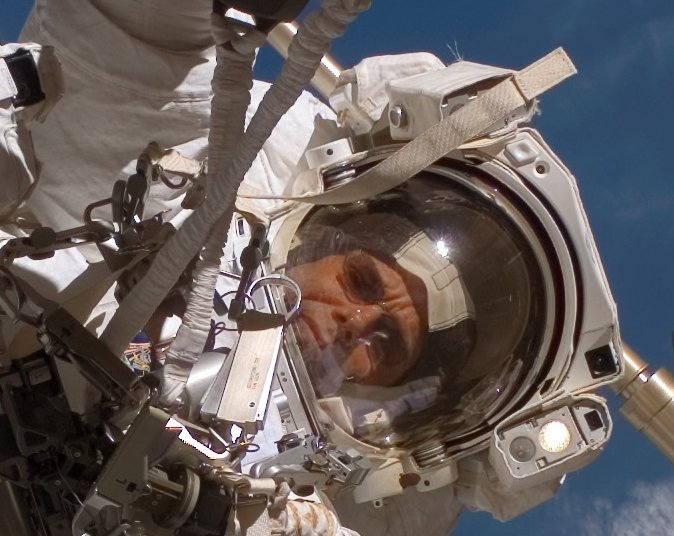
2006: Swedish astronaut Christer Fuglesang wears glasses during a construction mission for the International Space Station.

Special protection is required for space travel because the sunlight is far more intense and harmful than on Earth, where it is always filtered through the atmosphere. Sun protection is needed against much higher UV radiation and even against harmful infrared radiation, both within and outside the spacecraft. Within the spacecraft, astronauts wear sunglasses with darker lenses and a thin protective gold coating. During space walks, the visor of the astronauts' helmets, which also has a thin gold coating for extra protection, functions as strong sunglasses. The frames of sunglasses and corrective glasses used in space must meet special requirements. They must be flexible and durable, and must fit firmly in zero-gravity. Reliable fit is particularly important when wearing corrective glasses underneath tight helmets and in space suits: once inside the spacesuit, slipped glasses cannot be touched to push them back into place, sometimes for up to ten hours. Frames and glasses must be designed so that small pieces of the glasses such as screws and glass particles cannot become dislodged, then float and be inhaled. 90% of astronauts wear glasses in space, even if they do not require corrective glasses on Earth, because zero-gravity and pressure changes temporarily affect their vision.

The first sunglasses used in a Moon landing were the original pilot sunglasses produced by American Optical. In 1969 they were used aboard the Eagle, the Lunar Module of Apollo 11, the first crewed mission to land on the Moon. NASA research primarily by scientists James B. Stephens and Charles G. Miller at the Jet Propulsion Laboratory (JPL) resulted in special lenses that protected against the light in space and during laser and welding work. The lenses used colored dyes and small particles of zinc oxide, which absorbs ultraviolet light and is also used in sunscreen lotions. The research was later broadened to further terrestrial applications, e.g., deserts, mountains, and fluorescent-lighted offices, and the technology was commercially marketed by a U.S. company. Since 2002 NASA uses the frame of the designer model Titan Minimal Art of the Austrian company Silhouette, combined with specially dark lenses developed jointly by the company and "the" NASA optometrist Keith Manuel. The frame is very light at 1.8 grams, and does not have screws or hinges that could detach.

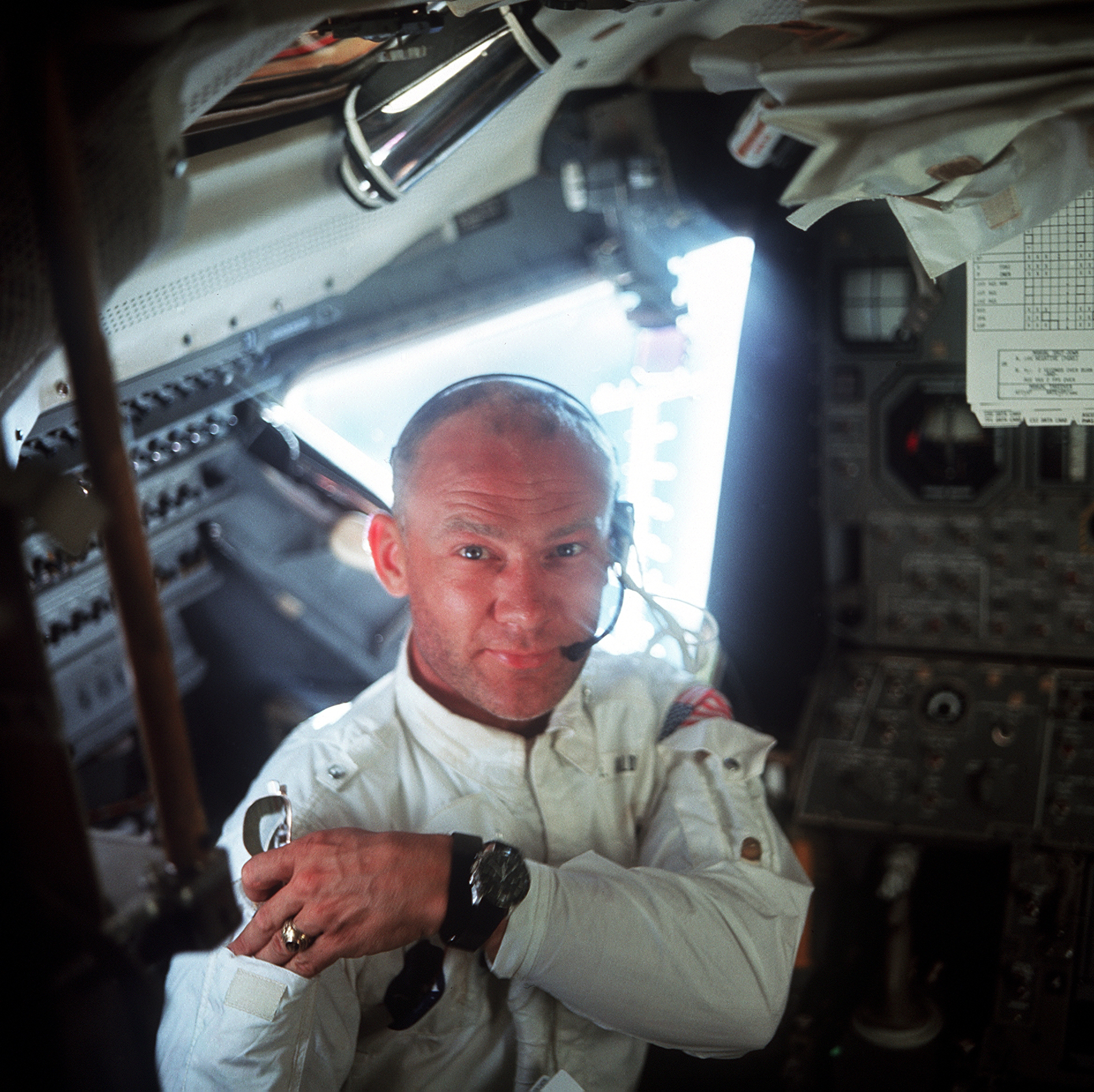
1969 on board the Eagle: Buzz Aldrin stows his sunglasses before the Moon landing.

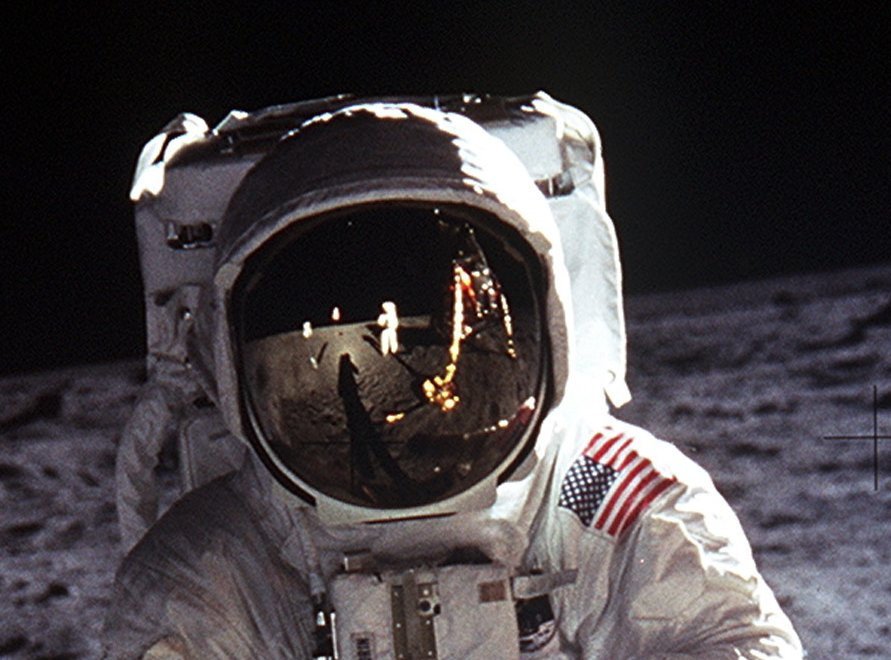
1969: Helmet visor protecting Aldrin's eyes on the Moon

== Construction ==
=== Lens ===
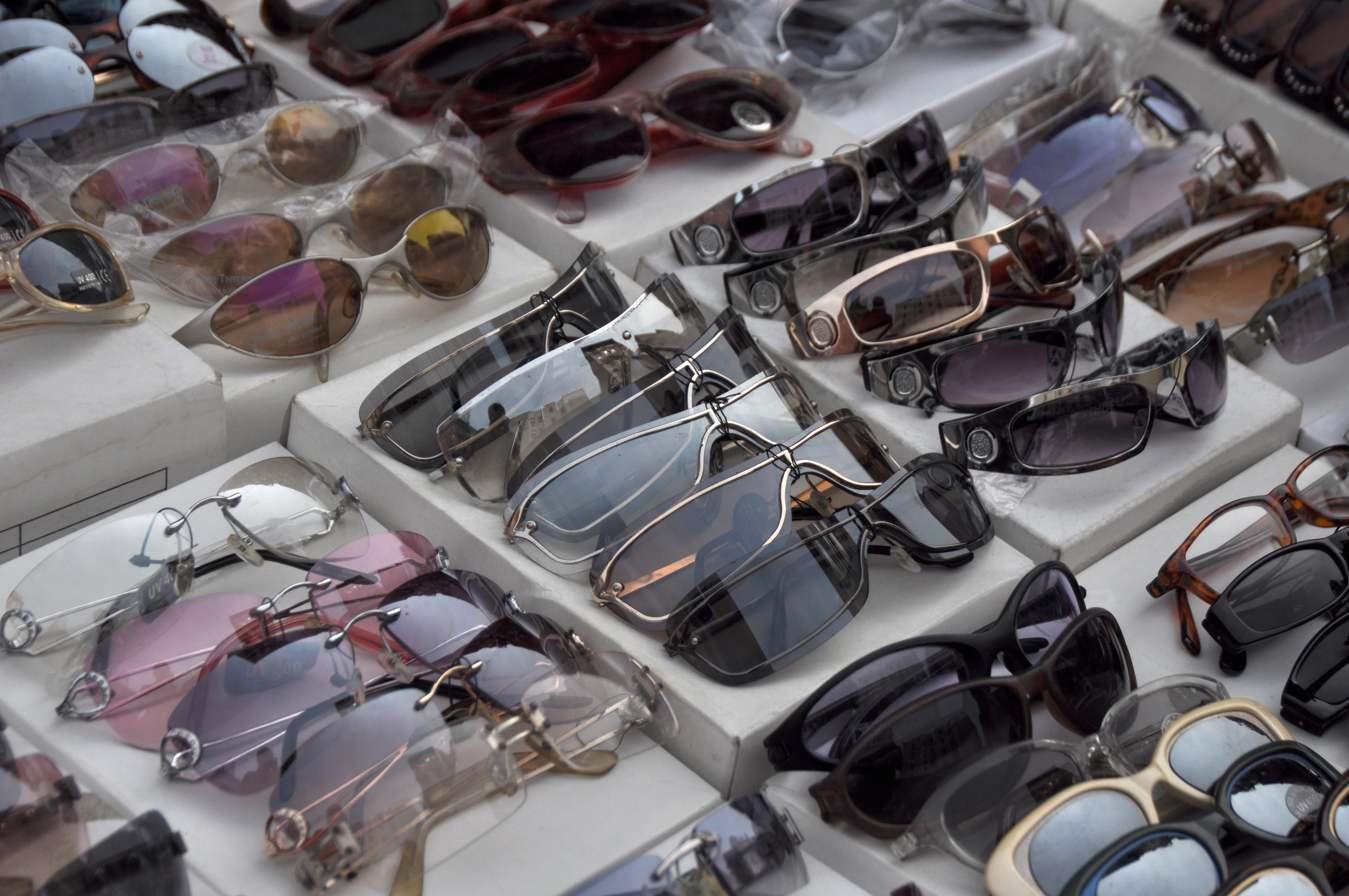
A range of sunglass models with lenses of different colors, for sale in New York City

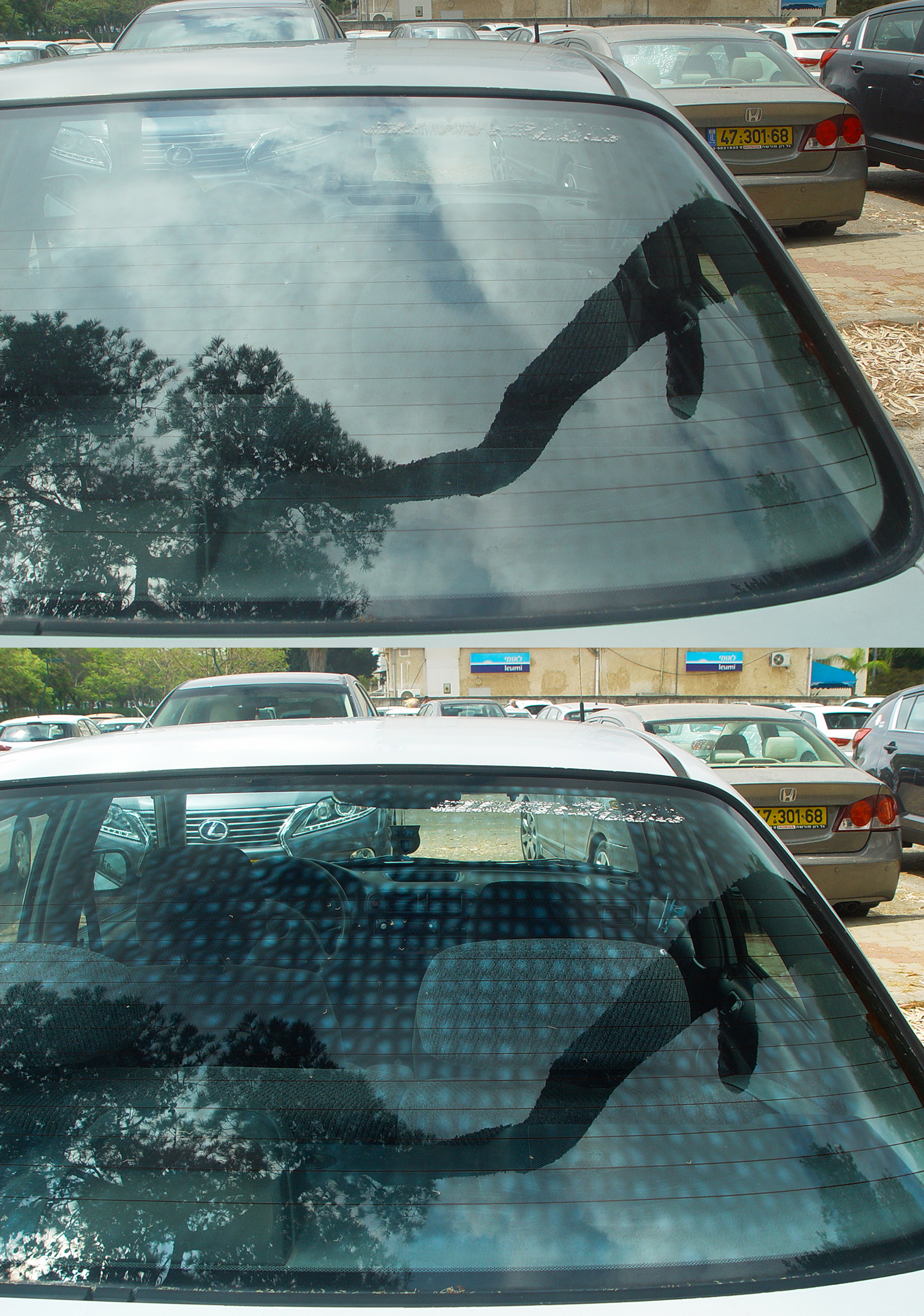
Different reflection characteristics and variations in glass stress are demonstrated when photographed through a polarizing lens (bottom picture).

The color of the lens can vary depending on style, fashion, and purpose, but for general use, red, grey, green, or brown are recommended to avoid or minimize color distortion, which could affect safety when, for instance, driving a car or a school bus.

- Gray and green lenses are considered neutral because they maintain true colors.
- Brown lenses cause some color distortion, but also increase contrast.
- Turquoise lenses are good for medium and high light conditions, because they are good at enhancing contrast, but do not cause significant color distortion.
- Yellow is "optimum for object definition, but creates a harsh visible light"; amber "allegedly makes distant objects appear more distinct, especially in snow or haze. These lenses are popular with skiers, hunters, boaters and pilots".
- Blue or purple lenses are popular with shooters as they increase the contrast of orange targets against green foliage or grass backdrops.

With the introduction of office computing, ergonomists may recommend mildly tinted glasses for use by display operators, in order to increase contrast.

While some blue blocking sunglasses (see above) are produced as regular sunglasses for exposure to bright sunlight, others—especially for macular degeneration patients—do not block light or other colors in order to function well in regular daylight and even dim sunlight. The latter allow the passage of enough light so normal evening activities can continue, while blocking the light that prevents production of the hormone melatonin. Blue-blocking tinted glasses, i.e. amber or yellow, are sometimes recommended to treat insomnia; they are worn in artificial lighting after dark, to reestablish the circadian rhythm and treat delayed sleep phase disorder.

Some models have polarized lenses, made of Polaroid polarized plastic sheeting, to reduce glare caused by light reflected from non-metallic surfaces such as water (see Brewster's angle for how this works) as well as by polarized diffuse sky radiation (skylight). This can be especially useful to see beneath the surface of the water when fishing.

A mirrored coating can be applied to the lens. This mirrored coating deflects some of the light when it hits the lens so that it is not transmitted through the lens, making it useful in bright conditions; however, it does not necessarily reflect UV radiation as well. Mirrored coatings can be made any color by the manufacturer for styling and fashion purposes. The color of the mirrored surface is irrelevant to the color of the lens. For example, a gray lens can have a blue mirror coating, and a brown lens can have a silver coating. Sunglasses of this type are sometimes called mirrorshades. A mirror coating does not get hot in sunlight and it prevents scattering of rays in the lens bulk.

Sunglass lenses are made of either glass, plastic, or SR-91. Plastic lenses are typically made from acrylic, polycarbonate, CR-39 or polyurethane. Glass lenses have the best optical clarity and scratch resistance, but are heavier than plastic lenses. They can also shatter or break on impact. Plastic lenses are lighter and shatter-resistant, but are more prone to scratching. Polycarbonate plastic lenses are the lightest, and are also almost shatterproof, making them good for impact protection. CR-39 is the most common plastic lens, due to low weight, high scratch resistance, and low transparency for ultraviolet and infrared radiation. SR-91 is a proprietary material that was introduced by Kaenon Polarized in 2001. Kaenon's lens formulation was the first non-polycarbonate material to pass the high-mass impact ANSI Z.87.1 testing. Additionally, it was the first to combine this passing score with the highest marks for lens clarity. Jerry Garcia's sunglasses had a polykrypton-C type of lens which was 'cutting edge' in 1995.

Any of the above features, color, polarization, gradation, mirroring, and materials, can be combined into the lens for a pair of sunglasses. Gradient glasses are darker at the top of the lens where the sky is viewed and transparent at the bottom. Corrective lenses or glasses can be manufactured with either tinting or darkened to serve as sunglasses. An alternative is to use the corrective glasses with a secondary lenses such as oversize sunglasses that fit over the regular glasses, clip-on lens that are placed in front of the glasses, and flip-up glasses which feature a dark lens that can be flipped up when not in use (see below). Photochromic lenses gradually darken when exposed to ultraviolet light.

=== Frames ===
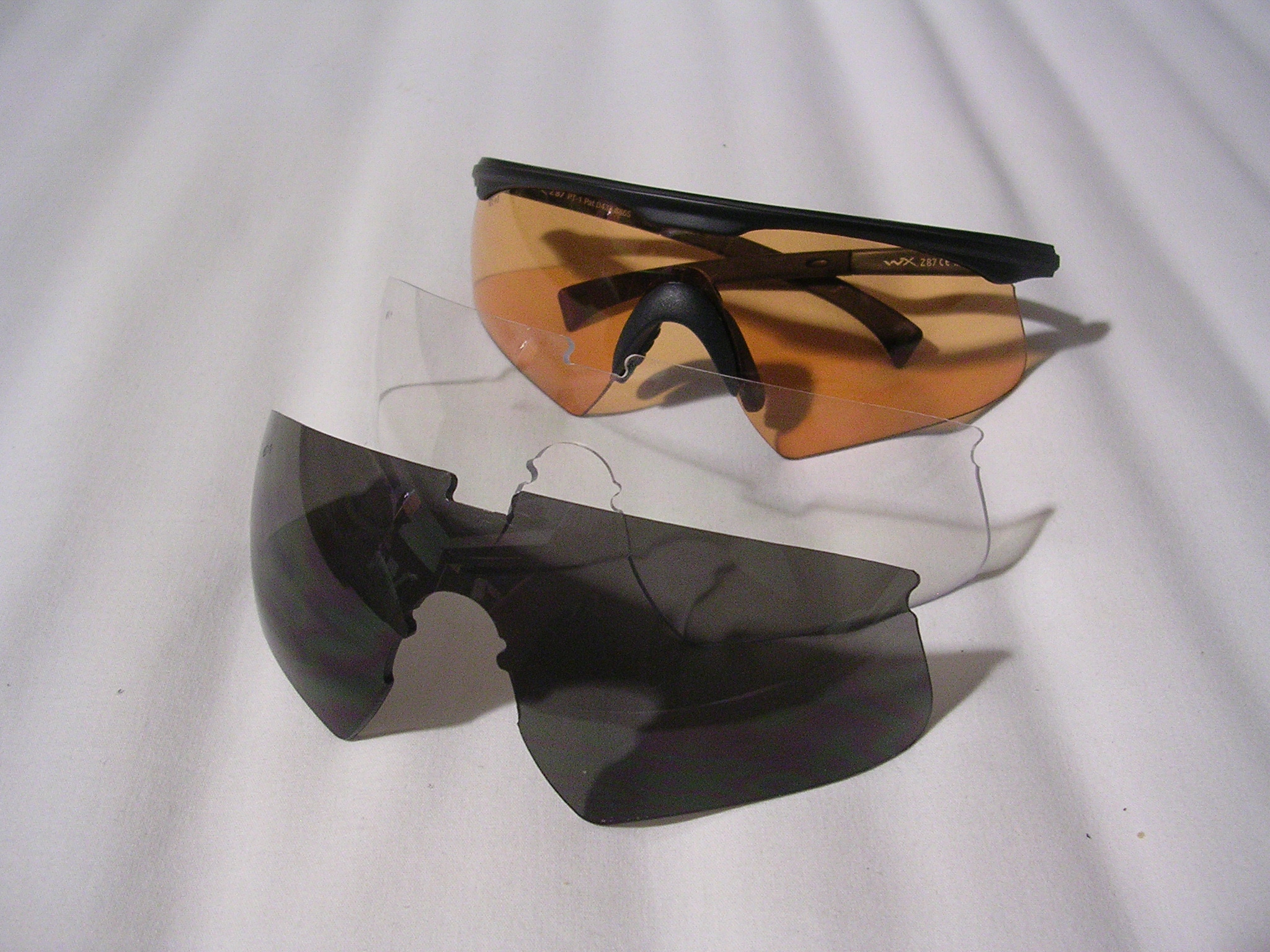
This sunglass eyeshield uses a nylon half-frame and interchangeable lenses.

Frames are generally made of plastic, nylon, a metal or a metal alloy. Nylon frames are usually used in sports because they are lightweight and flexible. They are able to bend slightly and return to their original shape instead of breaking when pressure is applied to them. This flex can also help the glasses grip better on the wearer's face. Metal frames are usually more rigid than nylon frames, thus they can be more easily damaged when the wearer participates in sport activities, but this is not to say that they cannot be used for such activities. Because metal frames are more rigid, some models have spring loaded hinges to help them grip the wearer's face better. The end of the resting hook and the bridge over the nose can be textured or have rubber or plastic material to improve hold. The ends of the resting hook are usually curved so that they wrap around the ear; however, some models have straight resting hooks. Oakley, for example, has straight resting hooks on all their glasses, preferring to call them "earstems".

In recent years, manufacturers have started to use various types of woods to make frames for sunglasses. Materials such as bamboo, ebony, rosewood, pear wood, walnut and zebrawood, are used making them non-toxic and nearly allergy free. The construction of a wooden frame involves laser-cutting from planks of wood. Already cut and ground to a uniform size, a buffing wheel is used to sand and buff every piece separately before they are assembled. The laser-cutouts of wood are then glued together by hand (mostly), layer on layer, to produce wooden frames. Some brands have experimented with recycled wood from objects like skateboards, whiskey barrels and baseball bats. Shwood, for example have experimented with these materials, they have even used recycled newspaper to manufacture frames.

Their final look can vary according to the color, type and finishing. With wooden sunglasses, various shades of brown, beige, burgundy or black are most common. Wooden sunglasses come in various designs and shapes. However, these sunglasses are usually more expensive than the conventional plastic, acetate or metal frames and require more care. They have been famously worn by the likes of Beyoncé, Snoop Dogg and Machine Gun Kelly.

Frames can be made to hold the lenses in several different ways. There are three common styles: full frame, half frame, and frameless. Full frame glasses have the frame go all around the lenses. Half frames go around only half the lens; typically the frames attach to the top of the lenses and on the side near the top. Frameless glasses have no frame around the lenses and the ear stems are attached directly to the lenses. There are two styles of frameless glasses: those that have a piece of frame material connecting the two lenses, and those that are a single lens with ear stems on each side.

Some sports-optimized sunglasses have interchangeable lens options. Lenses can be easily removed and swapped for a different lens, usually of a different color. The purpose is to allow the wearer to easily change lenses when light conditions or activities change. The reasons are that the cost of a set of lenses is less than the cost of a separate pair of glasses, and carrying extra lenses is less bulky than carrying multiple pairs of glasses. It also allows easy replacement of a set of lenses if they are damaged. The most common type of sunglasses with interchangeable lenses has a single lens or shield that covers both eyes. Styles that use two lenses also exist, but are less common.

=== Nose bridge ===
Nose bridges provide support between the lens and the face. They also prevent pressure marks caused by the weight of the lens or frame on the cheeks. People with large noses may need a low nose bridge on their sunglasses. People with medium noses may need a low or medium nose bridge. People with small noses may need sunglasses with high nose bridges to allow clearance.

== Fashion (alphabetically) ==
The following types are not all mutually exclusive; glasses may be in Aviator style with mirrored lenses, for example.

=== Aviator ===
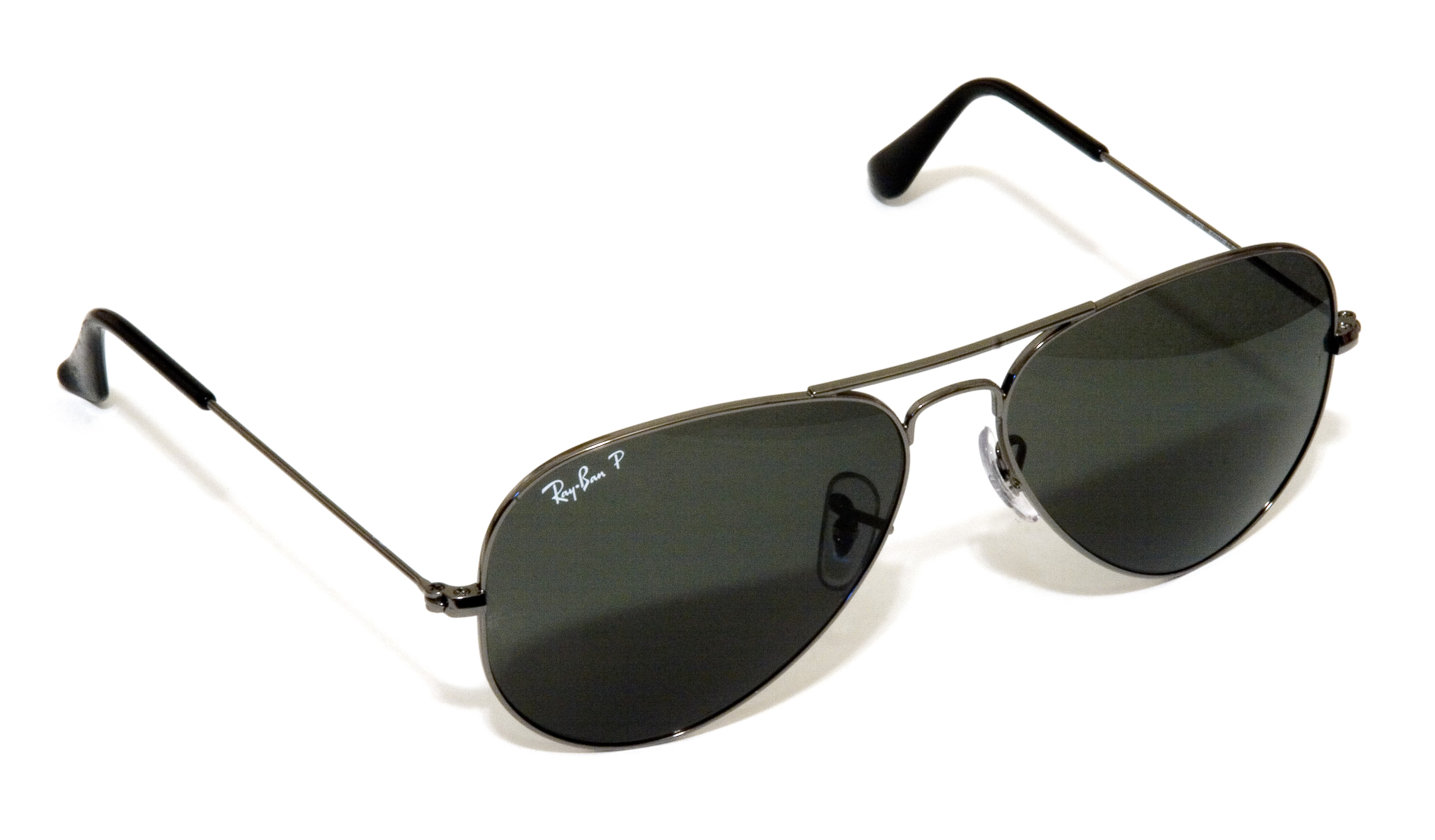
Aviator sunglasses

Aviator sunglasses feature oversize teardrop-shaped lenses and a thin metal frame with double or triple bridges.

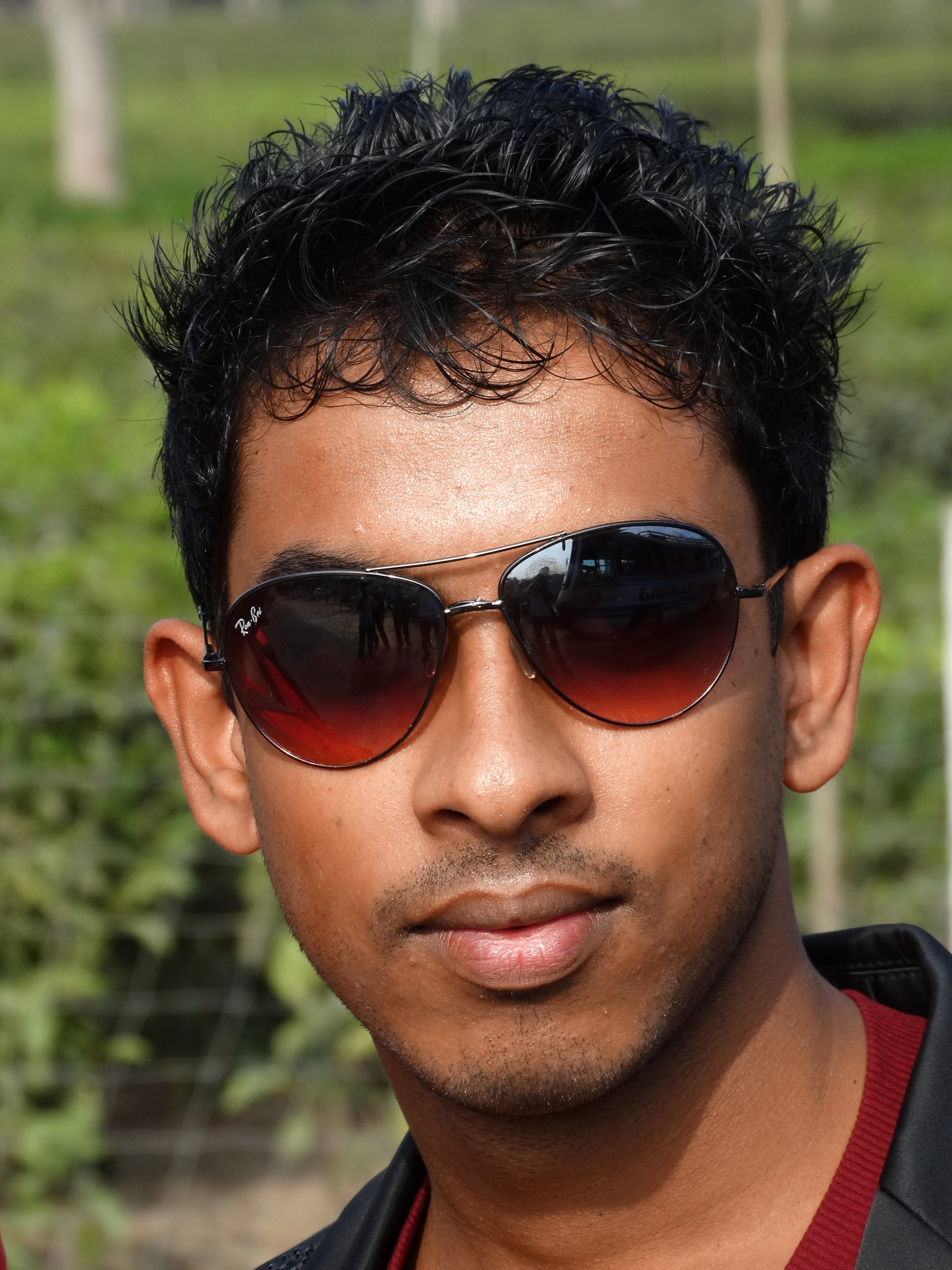
A Bengali man sporting aviator sunglasses

The design was introduced in 1936 by Bausch & Lomb for issue to U.S. military aviators. As a fashion statement, aviator sunglasses are often made in mirrored, colored, and wrap-around styles.

The model first gained popularity in the 1940s when Douglas MacArthur was seen sporting a pair at the Pacific Theatre. However, it was in the late 1960s when the frames became widely used with the rise of the hippie counterculture, which preferred large metallic sunglasses. The brand became an icon of the 1970s, worn by Paul McCartney and Freddie Mercury among others, and was also used as prescription eyeglasses. Aviators' association with disco culture led to a decline in their popularity by 1980. The model saw more limited use throughout the 1980s and 1990s, aided by a 1982 product placement deal, featured most notably in Top Gun and Cobra, with both films causing a 40% rise in 1986. Aviators became popular again around 2000, as the hippie movement experienced a brief revival, and was prominently featured in the MTV show Jackass.

=== Browline ===
Based on the eyeglass design of the same name, browline glasses have hard plastic or horn-rimmed arms and upper portions joined to a wire lower frame. A traditional, conservative style based on mid-20th century design, browlines were adapted into sunglasses form in the 1980s and rapidly became one of the most popular styles; it has ebbed and sprung in popularity in the decades that have followed.

=== Oversized ===
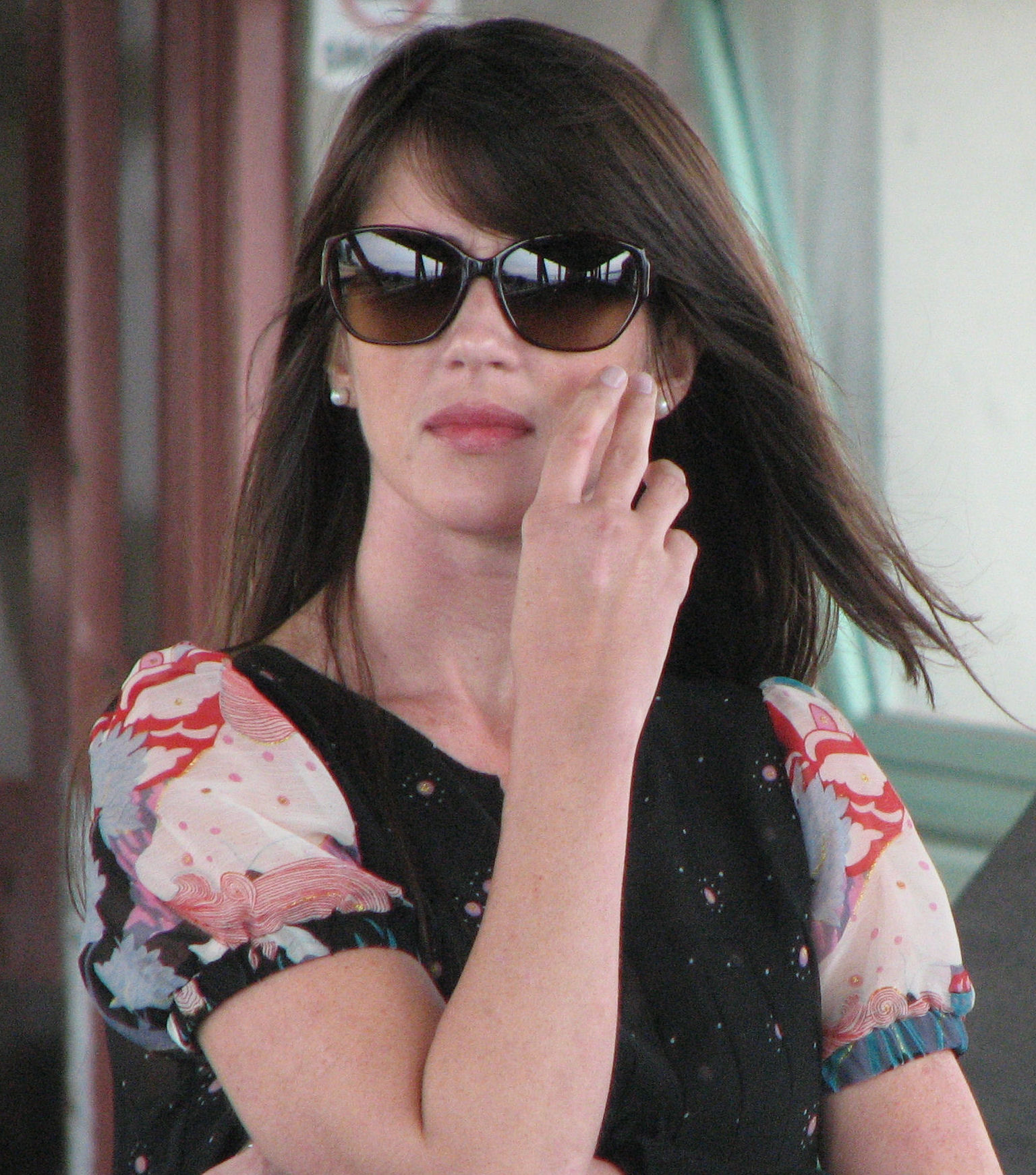
Oversized sunglasses à la Jackie O

Oversized sunglasses, which were fashionable in the 1980s, are now often used for humorous purposes. They usually come in bright colors with colored lenses and can be purchased cheaply.

The singer Elton John sometimes wore oversized sunglasses on stage in the mid-1970s as part of his Captain Fantastic act.

Since the late 2000s, moderately oversized sunglasses have become a fashion trend. There are many variations, such as the "Onassis", discussed below, and Dior white sunglasses.

Onassis glasses or "Jackie O's" are very large sunglasses worn by women. This style of sunglasses is said to mimic the kind most famously worn by Jacqueline Kennedy Onassis in the 1960s. The glasses continue to be popular with women, and celebrities may use them, ostensibly to hide from paparazzi.

Oversized sunglasses, because of their larger frames and lenses, are useful for individuals who are trying to minimize the apparent size or arch of their nose. Oversized sunglasses also offer more protection from sunburn due to the larger areas of skin they cover, although sunblock should still be used.

=== Shutter shades ===
Shutter shades were invented in the late 1940s, became a fad in the early 1980s and have experienced a revival in the early-to-mid 2010s. Instead of tinted lenses, they decrease sun exposure by means of a set of parallel, horizontal shutters (like a small window shutter). Analogous to Inuit goggles (see above), the principle is not to filter light, but to decrease the amount of sun rays falling into the wearer's eyes. To provide UV protection, shutter shades sometimes use lenses in addition to the shutters; if not, they provide very insufficient protection against ultraviolet radiation and blue light.

=== Teashades ===
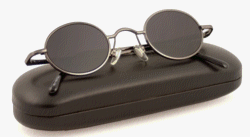
Teashade sunglasses

"Teashades" (sometimes also called "John Lennon glasses", "hippie glasses," "Ozzy glasses," "Round Metal", or, occasionally, "Granny glasses") were a type of psychedelic art wire-rim sunglasses that were often worn, usually for purely aesthetic reasons, by members of the 1960s counterculture. Pop icons such as Mick Jagger, Roger Daltrey, John Lennon, Jerry Garcia, Boy George, Liam Gallagher, Suggs, Ozzy Osbourne, Duckie (Jon Cryer) in Pretty in Pink and Jodie Foster's character in the film Taxi Driver all wore teashades. The original teashade design was made up of medium-sized, perfectly round lenses, supported by pads on the bridge of the nose and a thin wire frame. When teashades became popular in the late 1960s, they were often elaborated: Lenses were elaborately colored, mirrored, and produced in excessively large sizes, and with the wire earpieces exaggerated. A uniquely colored or darkened glass lens was usually preferred. Modern versions tend to have plastic lenses, as do many other sunglasses. Teashades are hard to find in shops today; however, they can still be found at many costume Web sites and in some countries.

The term has now fallen into disuse, although references can still be found in literature of the time. "Teashades" was also used to describe glasses worn to hide the effects of recreational drugs such as marijuana (conjunctival injection) or heroin (pupillary constriction) or just bloodshot eyes.

=== Wayfarer ===
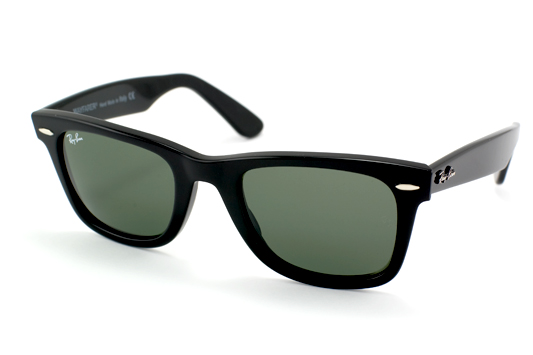
Original Ray-Ban Wayfarer

The Ray-Ban Wayfarer is a (mostly) plastic-framed design for sunglasses produced by the Ray-Ban company. Introduced in 1952, the trapezoidal lenses are wider at the top than the bottom (inspired by the Browline eyeglasses popular at the time), and were famously worn by James Dean, Roy Orbison, Elvis Presley, Bob Marley, The Beatles and other actors and singers. The original frames were black; frames in many different colors were later introduced. There is often a silver piece on the corners as well. Since the early 1980s, makers have also developed variants of the model, most notably the Clubmaster model, introduced in 1982, essentially Browlines made of plastic.

These were mostly popular in the late 1950s and during the 1960s (being linked to the rock-and-roll/blues and Mod cultures), before plastic glasses were displaced by metallic rims popular among the counter-culture. In the late 1970s, the rise of New wave music, New Romanticism and the popularity of The Blues Brothers aside from 50s and 1960s nostalgia and the anti-disco backlash later on brought the model out of near-retirement, becoming the most sold model between 1980 and 1999 aided by a lucrative 1982 product placement deal, which put it on many movies and TV shows such as The Breakfast Club and Moonlighting. 1980s nostalgia and the influence of the hipster subculture and the television series Mad Men boosted Wayfarers once again after a slump in the 1990s and 2000s, also aided by a 2000 redesign (New Wayfarer), surpassing Aviators since 2012.

=== Wrap-around ===
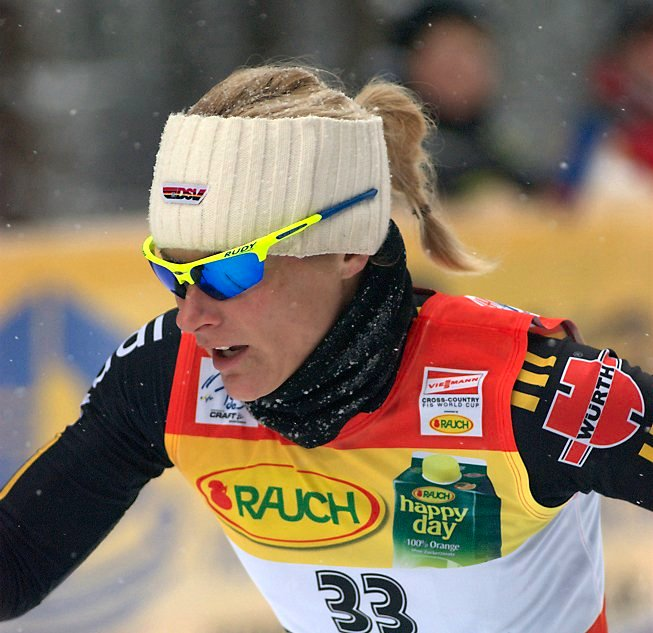
Mirrored wrap-around sunglasses

Wrap-arounds are a style of sunglasses characterized by being strongly curved, to wrap around the face. They may have a single curved semi-circular lens that covers both eyes and much of the same area of the face covered by protective goggles, usually with a minimal plastic frame and single piece of plastic serving as a nosepiece. Glasses described as wraparound may alternatively have two lenses, but again with a strongly curved frame.

These were first made in the 1960s as variants of the Aviator model, used by Yoko Ono and Clint Eastwood in the Dirty Harry films. The modern variant surged in the mid-1980s, heavily based on the then-popular Wayfarer, but adapting it to a more futuristic look. As a backlash against 80s fashion occurred in the 1990s, wraparounds became one of the favorite frames of the decade.

== Variants ==
=== Clip-on ===
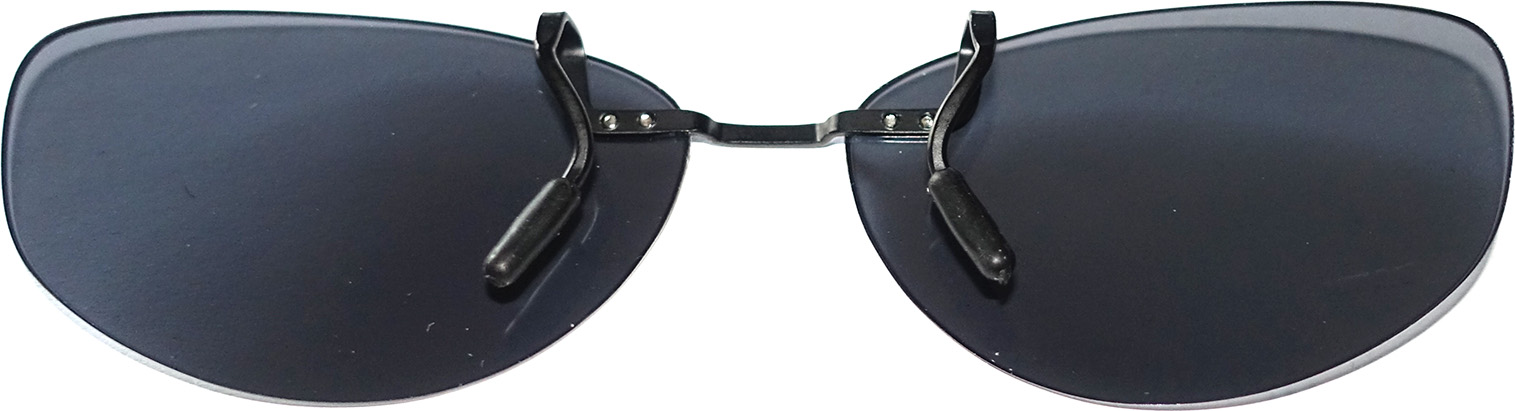
Clip-on sunglasses

Clip-on glasses are a form of tinted glasses that can be clipped on to eyeglasses for protection from the sun. An alternative are flip-up glasses.

=== Gradient lenses ===
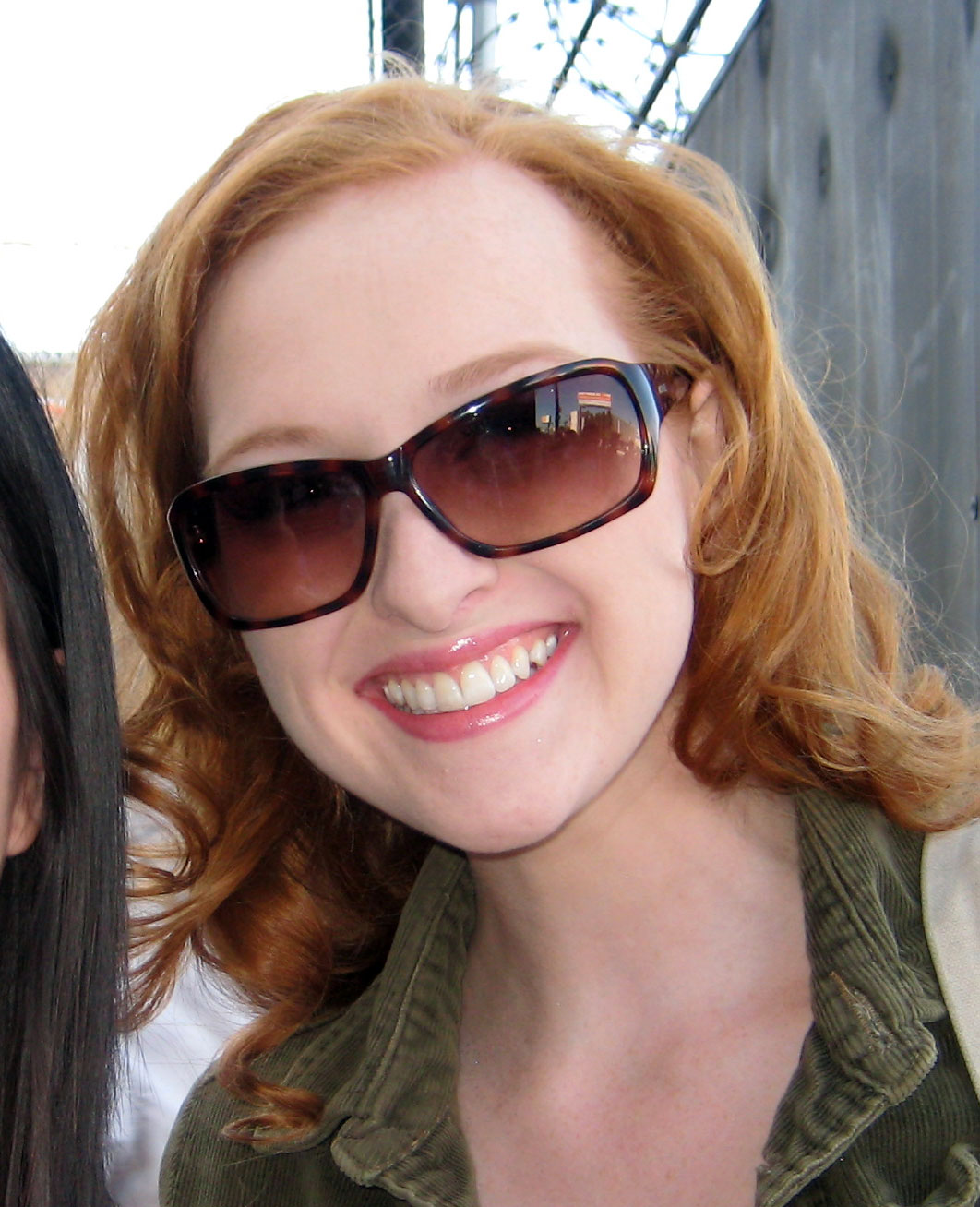
Glasses with gradient lenses

Gradient lenses go from a darker shade at the top to a lighter one at the bottom, so there will be more protection from sunlight the higher one looks through the lens, but the lower one looks through the lens, the less protection is offered. An advantage is that one can wear them indoors without fear of tripping over something and also allowing the user to see. Wearing sunglasses to nightclubs has become common in recent times, where the gradient lens comes in handy. Gradient lenses may also be advantageous for activities such as flying airplanes and driving automobiles, as they allow the operator a clear view of the instrument panel, low in his line of sight and usually hidden in shadow, while still reducing glare from the view out the windscreen. The Independent (London), has also referred to these style of sunglasses as the Murphy Lens.

Double gradient lenses are dark at the top, light in the middle and dark at the bottom.

Gradients should not be confused with bifocals and progressive lenses.

=== Flip-up ===
Flip-up sunglasses add the benefits of sunglasses to corrective eyeglasses, allowing the wearer to flip up the tinted lenses for indoor use. Alternatives include: clip-on glasses, and wrap around sunglasses that fit over the eyeglasses.

=== Mirrored ===
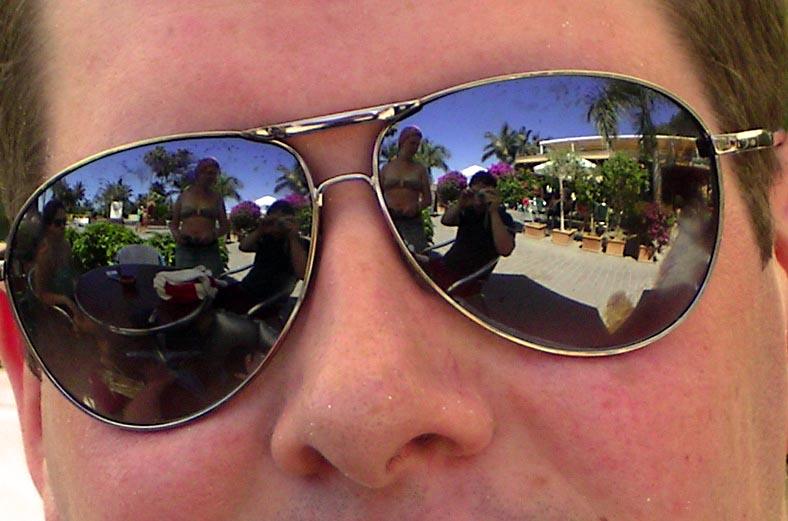
Mirrored aviators

Mirrored lenses have a metallic, partially reflective coating on the outer surface combined with a tinted glass lens. Mirrored lenses of different colors can expand the range of fashion styles.

=== Wing-mirror ===
Wing mirror sunglasses, or rear-view mirror sunglasses or back-sight glasses are performance or novelty eyewear featuring a small mirror integrated into the corner of the lens. They function just like the wing mirror on a car, allowing the wearer to see what is happening behind with a quick glance of the eye or tilt of the head.

== Other names ==
There are various words referring to eyepieces with darkened lenses:

- Shades is a term used in North America.
- Glares is a term popular in India if the glass is dark.
- Glints is a term for glasses originating from the "glint" that is noticeable when somebody wearing glasses moves their head.
- Sun spectacles is a term used by some opticians.
- Spekkies is a term used predominantly in southern Australia.
- Sun specs (also sunspecs) is the shortened form of sun spectacles.
- Sunglass a monocle version.
- Sun-shades can also refer to the sun-shading eyepiece-type, although the term is not exclusive to these. Also in use is the derivative abbreviation, "shades".
- Dark glasses (also preceded by pair of) — generic term in common usage.
- Sunnies is used in Australian, South African and New Zealand slang.
- Smoked spectacles usually refers to the darkened eyepieces worn by blind people.
- Solar shields Usually refers to models of sunglasses with large lenses.
- Stunna shades: Used as a slang term in the hyphy movement, usually referring to sunglasses with oversized lenses.
- Glecks is Scottish slang for glasses or sunglasses.
- Cooling glasses is a term used in Southern India (predominantly Kerala) and the Middle East for sunglasses.

== Producers ==
Most brands are produced by two producers:

- Luxottica Group (revenue €9 billion (2018))
- Safilo Group (revenue €1 billion (2018))

While other niche players are:

- Kaenon Polarized
- Maui Jim
- Serengeti
- ic! berlin
- Randolph Engineering, Inc.
- Gargoyles Eyewear
- William Painter
- Heat Wave Visual

== See also ==
- Eye patch
- Goggles
- Photochromic lens
- Photosensitive glass
- Pulfrich effect
