= Marcolin =

Italian eyewear manufacturer

Marcolin SpA
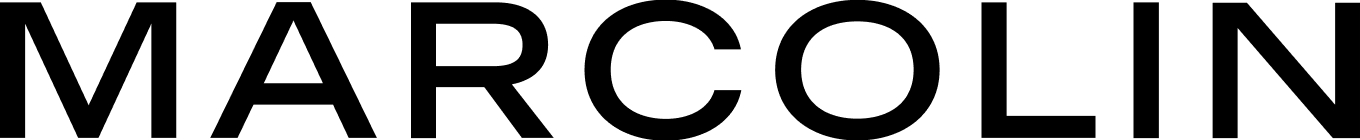
- Type: Private
- Industry: Eyewear
- Founded: 1961; 65 years ago
- Founder: Giovanni Marcolin
- Headquarters: Longarone, Italy
- Key people: Fabrizio Curci (CEO)
- Number of employees: 2,000 (2025)
- Parent: VSP Vision
- Website: marcolin.com

Marcolin SpA is an Italian eyewear manufacturer founded in Veneto and headquartered in Longarone. Started in 1961 by Giovanni Marcolin Coffen, it owns and licenses twenty-five different brands, including Tom Ford, Adidas, Skechers, Christian Louboutin and Max Mara.

Except for 2020, its annual revenue grew every year between 2013 and 2022 – in the latter year, it reached €547 million. In December 2025, California-based VSP Vision announced it had completed the purchase of Marcolin, which had been majority-owned by PAI Partners since 2012.

== History ==
Founded in Veneto in 1961 by Giovanni Marcolin and originally known as Fabbrica artigiana, it began by manufacturing gold-laminated temples on eyewear. Expanding into the US in 1968 and opening offices in France, Switzerland, and Germany, it was already producing one million frames per year by the 1980s.

By 2012, Marcolin was Italy's third largest eyewear manufacturer, behind only Leonardo Del Vecchio's Luxottica and the Safilo Group. It was around this time that a majority stake in Marcolin was acquired by the French private equity firm PAI Partners, initially at 78% but increasing to 83% in December 2019. By 2018, Marcolin has claimed to sell 14.6 million eyeglasses that year.

Subsequently, the company sold 10% of its shares to the luxury conglomerate LVMH when it partnered with the French group and founded the in-house eyewear manufacturing company Thélios, in which it held a 49% stake. In December 2021, the firms separated, with Marcolin buying back LVMH's stake while transferring its share in Thélios to the French company.

Also in 2021, Marcolin acquired the German eyewear manufacturer Ic! berlin. Three years later, its shareholders sought a valuation for the manufacturer, attracting acquisition proposals and interest from several companies in the sector.

With Thélios being the only major rival not mentioned as a potential suitor, Kering and EssilorLuxottica were leading bidders for the company – although offers from Safilo, Marchon Eyewear, De Rigo and Hong Kong-based private equity firm FountainVest Partners were also considered.

After announcing the takeover of Marcolin from the French company PAI and its minority shareholders in September 2025, VSP Vision completed the purchase of the Italian firm three months later.

== Brands ==
Marcolin's proprietary and licensed brands include:

- Abercrombie & Fitch
- Adidas
- BMW
- Christian Louboutin
- Gant
- GCDS
- Guess
- Harley-Davidson
- Ic! berlin
- J Landon
- Kenneth Cole
- Marciano
- Max Mara
- Max&Co
- Pucci
- Skechers
- Timberland
- Tod's
- Tom Ford
- Web Eyewear
- Zegna
