= Simon Mainwaring =

American businessman

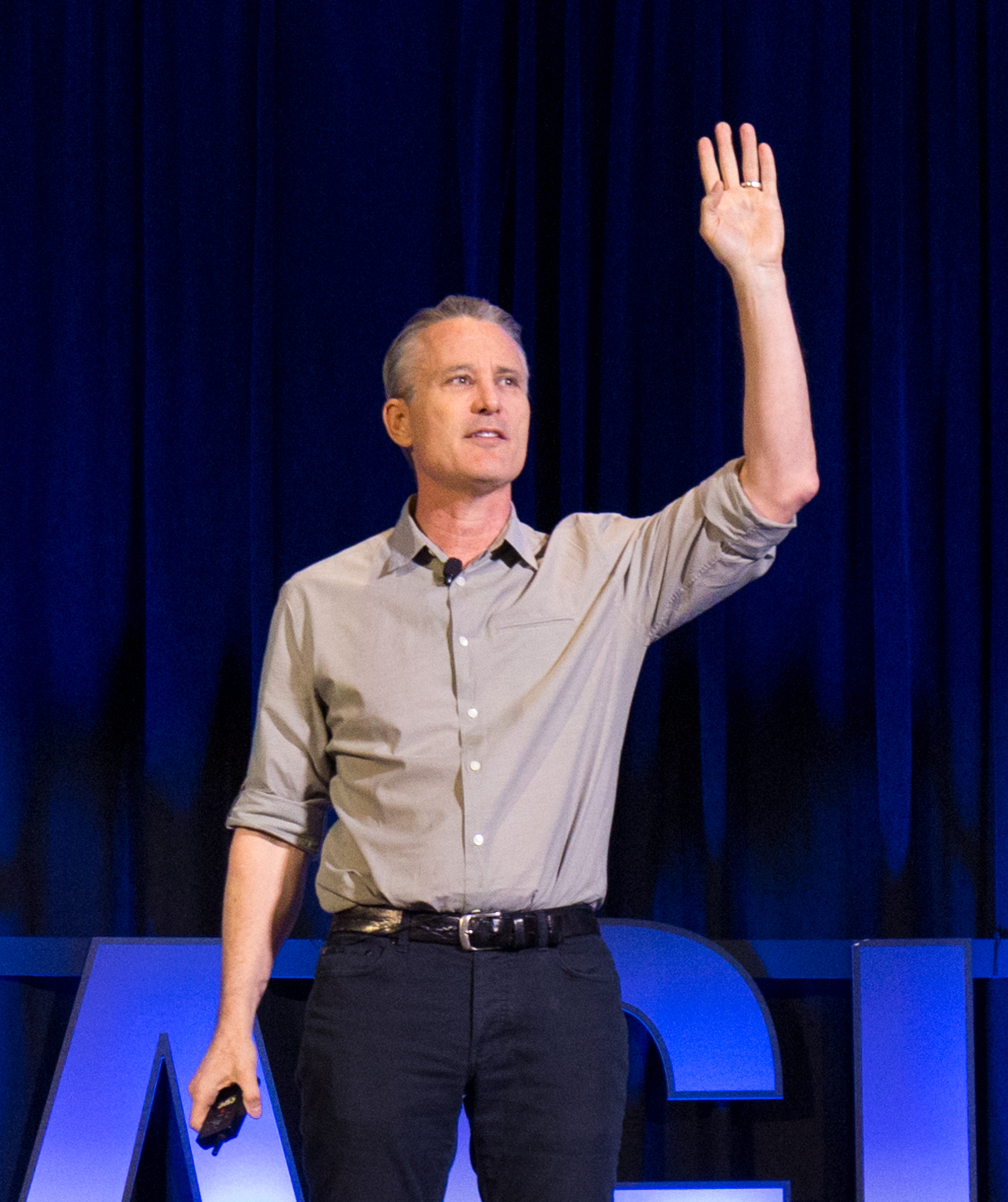
- Simon Mainwaring addresses the Face 2 Face Entertainment Conference 2019
- Occupations: Founder and CEO of We First Inc., author
- Website: www.simonmainwaring.com

Simon Mainwaring is a branding expert and author of We First: How Brands and Consumers Use Social Media to Build a Better World (Palgrave Macmillan 2011) and Lead With We: The Business Revolution that Will Save Our Future (Matt Holt/BenBella 2021). He is the founder and CEO of Culver City, California-based We First Inc., a brand consultancy.

== Background ==
Prior to founding We First, Mainwaring was creative director at advertising agencies such as Saatchi & Saatchi, Wieden & Kennedy, and Ogilvy working with clients like Motorala, Nike, and Toyota. His work is mentioned in Cutting Edge Advertising by Jim Aitchison.

== We First: How Brands & Consumers Use Social Media to Build a Better World ==
The book We First was released on June 7, 2011. Publishers Weekly says the book "proposes cooperation between governments, philanthropies, and capitalist corporations to achieve meaningful social transformation

We First was a New York Times, Wall Street Journal and Amazon best seller. Strategy+business named it "Best Business Marketing Book of 2011" saying, "It’s the best marketing book of the year because anyone who reads it will begin to question how his or her company does business, and that’s the initial step to change."

== We First, Inc. ==
Mainwaring is the founder and CEO of We First, Inc., a Culver City-based creative consultancy for brands. Clients include brands such as TOMS, Timberland, VF Corporation, SAP, Avery Dennison, VSP Global, Coca-Cola, Clif Bar, The Coffee Bean & Tea Leaf, Wrangler, and Reef. The firm is a certified B Corporation.
