= Visionworks =

American optical retailer

- Company type: Private, subsidiary
- Industry: eyewear/optical retailing
- Founded: 1988
- Headquarters: 175 E. Houston Street; San Antonio, Texas 78205; United States
- Number of locations: approx. 699 (as of 2015), operated under various trade names (not the ECCA name)
- Area served: United States
- Key people: (CEO) Greg Hare
- Number of employees: 8,000
- Parent: VSP Global
- Website: https://www.visionworks.com/

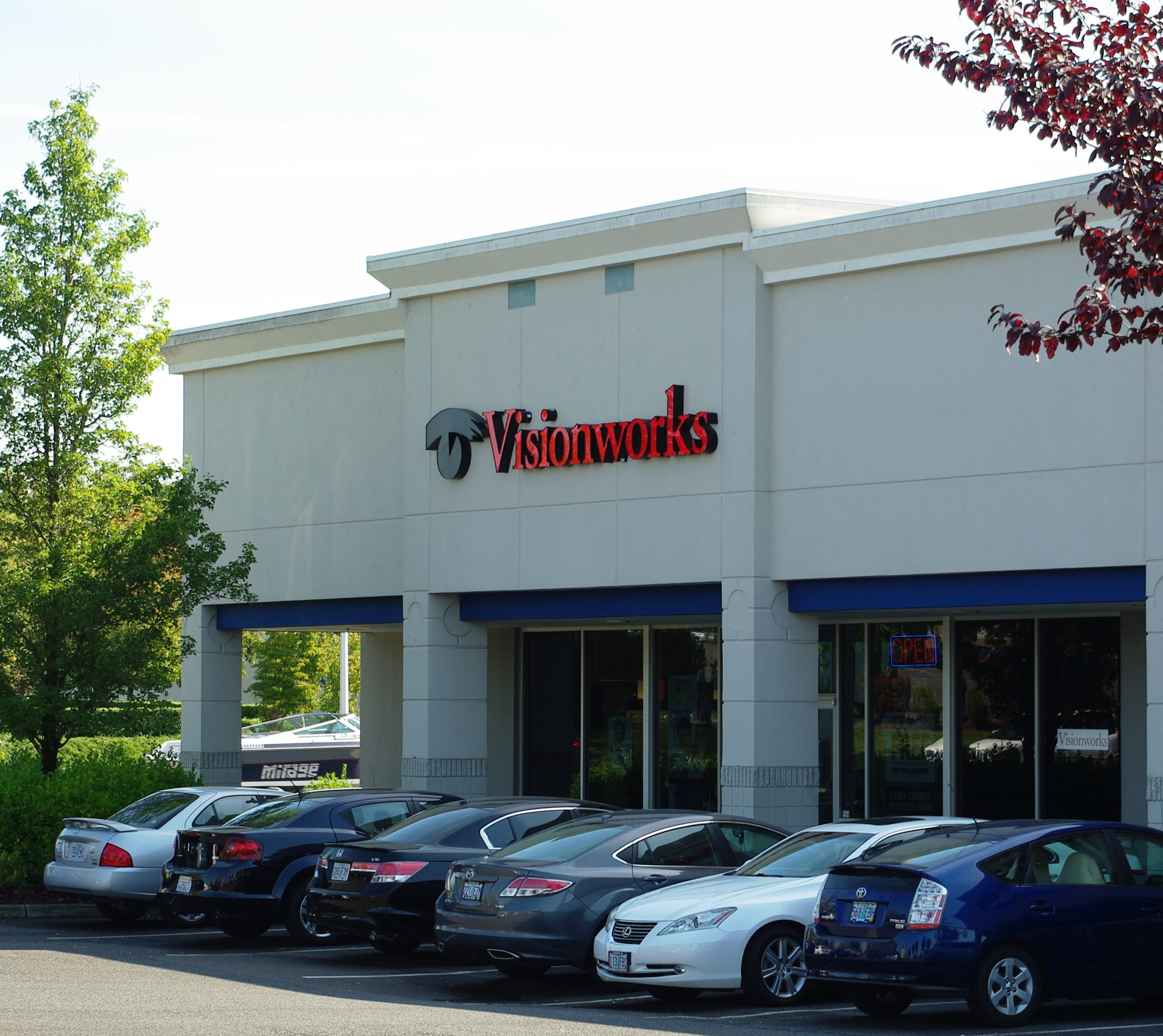
A Visionworks location in a strip mall in Hillsboro, Oregon

Visionworks of America, Inc. (formerly known as Doctors' Value Vision) is an American company which operates or manages 711 optical retail stores in 40 U.S. states and the District of Columbia. The company was incorporated in 1988. It is based in Downtown San Antonio, Texas, and has about 8,000 employees.

Visionworks of America was once a subsidiary of HVHC, a Highmark Inc. company. Visionwork's former parent company, ECCA Holdings Corp., merged with Pittsburgh-based HVHC in 2006, resulting in Eye Care Centers of America Inc. becoming a wholly owned Highmark subsidiary. ECCA had 385 stores, in 36 states, at that time.

All stores sell frames, lenses, sunglasses, and accessories. Comprehensive service offerings include contact lens dispensing, free adjustments and repairs, and doctors of optometry at or next to every store. Visionworks also sells contact lenses online.

On June 27, 2019, VSP Global announced plans to acquire Visionworks. The acquisition was completed on October 1, 2019.
