= Mirrored sunglasses =

Type of sunglasses

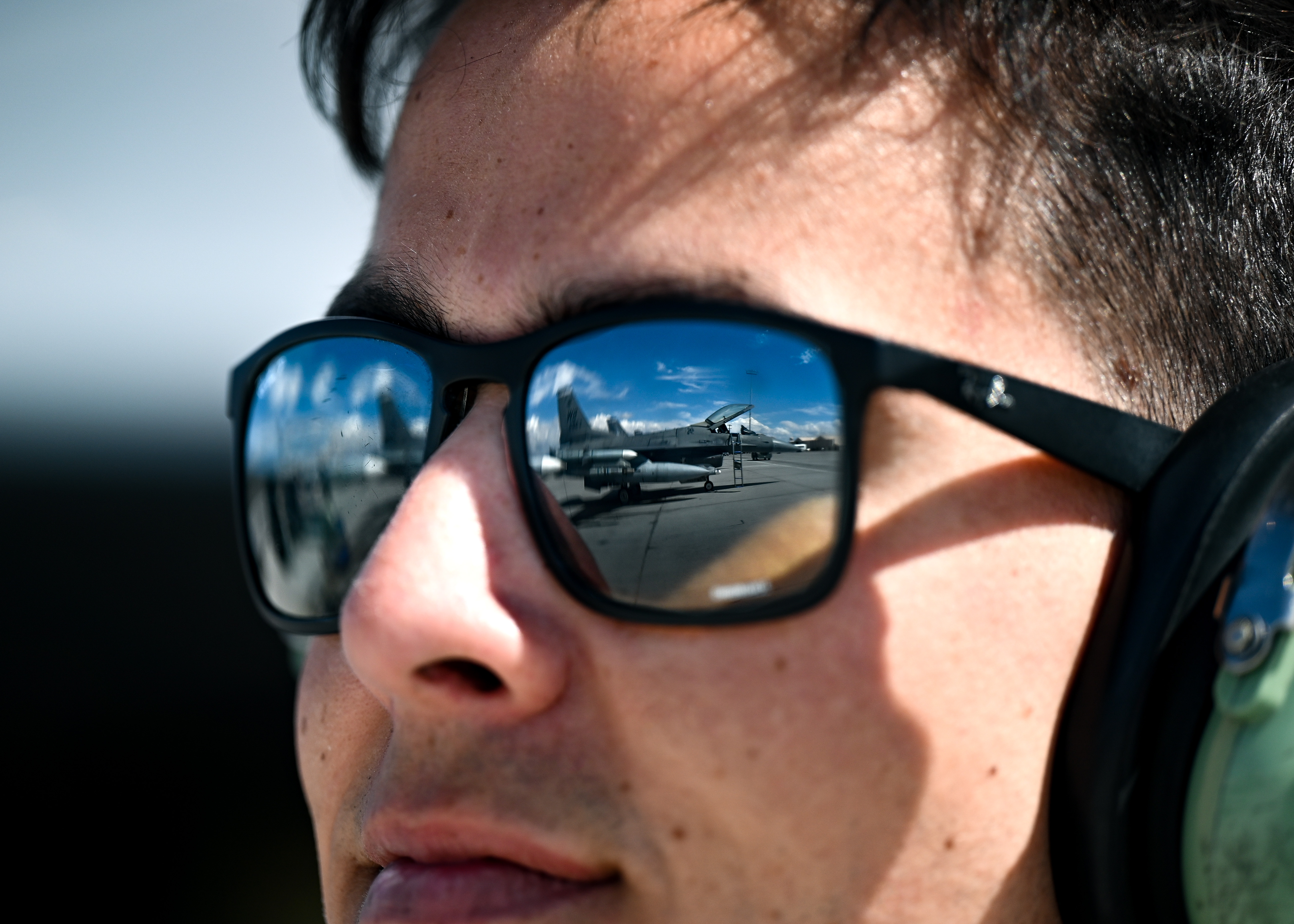
A person wearing mirrored sunglasses

Mirrored sunglasses are sunglasses with a reflective optical coating (called a mirror coating or flash coating) on the outside of the lenses to make them appear like small mirrors. The lenses typically give the wearer's vision a brown or grey tint. The mirror coating decreases the amount of light passing through the tinted lens by a further 10–60%, making it especially useful for conditions of sand, water, snow, and higher altitudes. Mirrored sunglasses are one-way mirrors.

The color of the mirror coating is independent of the tint of the lenses. It is determined by the thickness and structure of the layer.

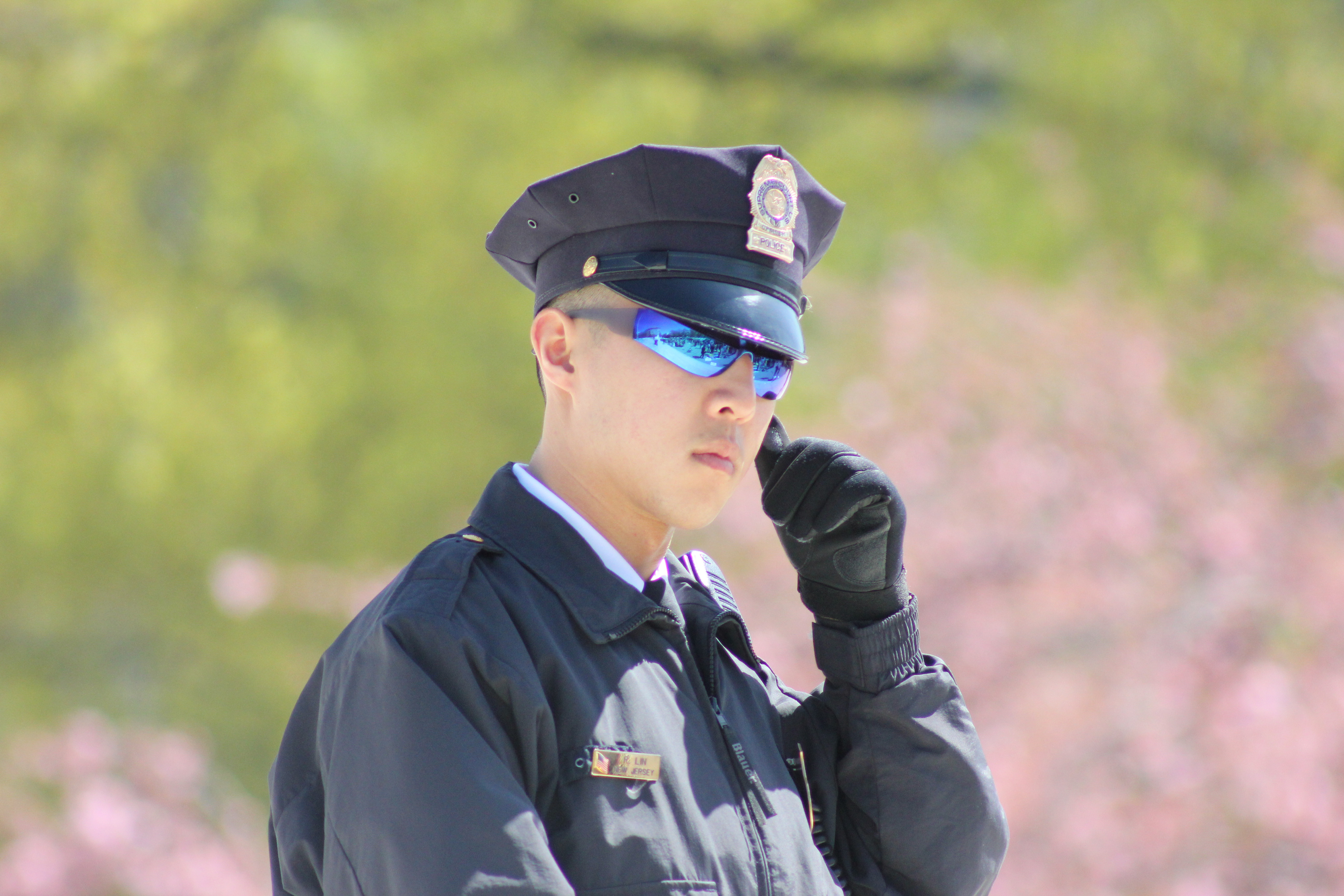
Supreme Court Police officer wearing wraparound mirrored sunglasses in Washington, D.C.

Their popularity with police officers in the United States has earned them the nickname "cop shades". The two most popular styles for these are dual lenses set in metal frames (which are often confused with aviators), and wraparound (a single, smooth, semi-circular lens that covers both eyes and much of the same area of the face covered by protective goggles, combined with a minimal plastic frame and single piece of plastic serving as a nose pad). Wraparound sunglasses are also quite popular in the world of extreme sports.

== Usage in sports ==
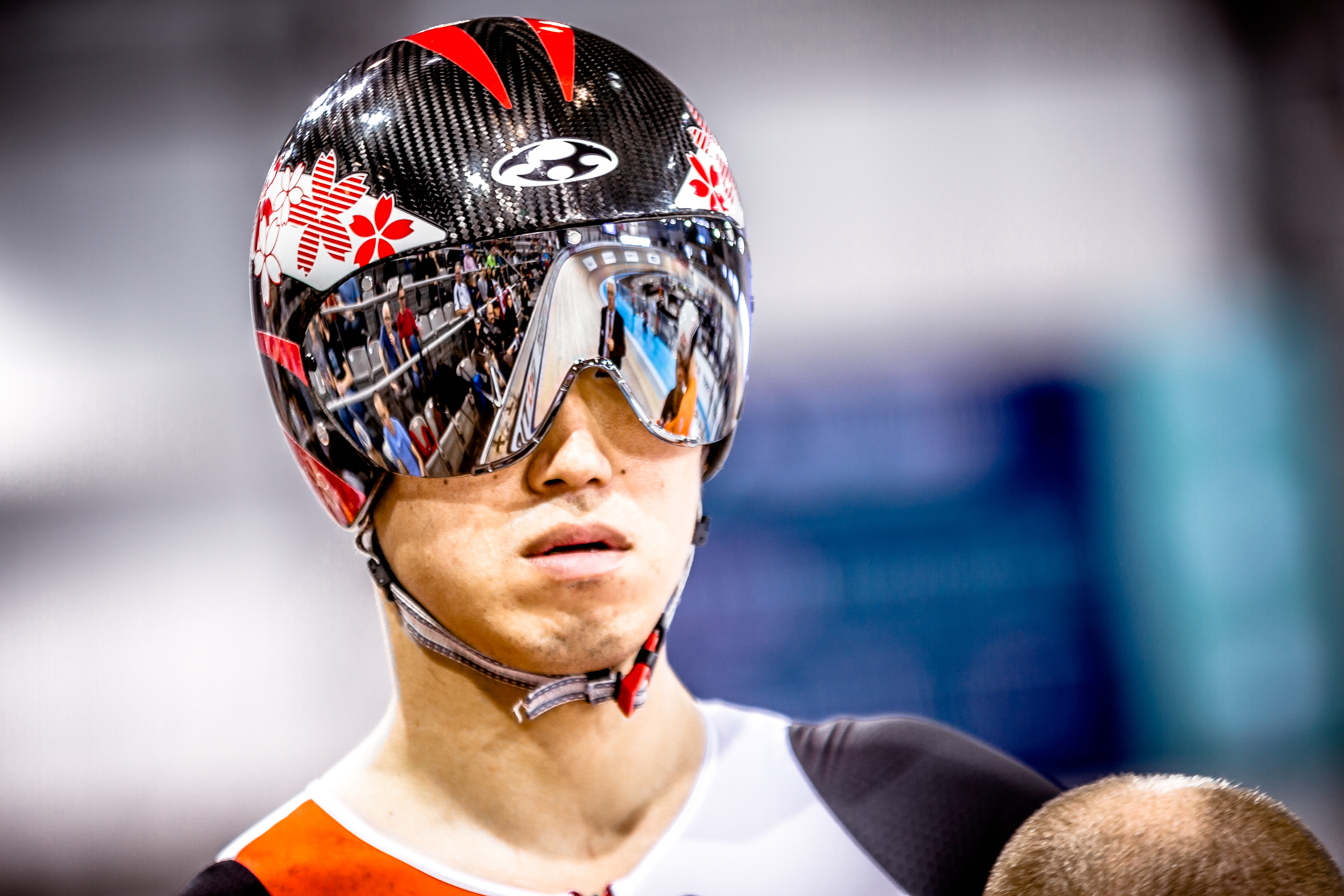
Track cyclist Yuta Wakimoto wearing a helmet with a mirrored visor

Many sports take advantage of the reflective material in mirrored sunglasses. Especially in outdoor sports play, mirrored sunglasses are greatly beneficial to the wearer.

Sports that can use mirrored sunglasses include:

- Skiing
- Snowboarding
- Kayaking
- Water skiing
- Surfing
- Windsurfing
- Hiking
- Cricket
- Cycling

In outdoor sports, the glare of the sun can be very intense due to the reflection of the sun from water and snow.

== Reflective coating ==
The simplest version of a mirror coating is a single layer of a deposited thin film of a suitable metal, usually prepared by ion beam deposition, sputter deposition or vapor deposition. But this kind of coating is very prone to scratching, and degrades, especially in a corrosive environment like salt water.

The reflective coating on mirrored glasses can be very fragile and prone to scratching. Some high-end sunglass brands can come with anti-scratch coating. There can be steps implemented to protect the sunglasses and prevent scratching or damage.

- Clean the sunglasses regularly using sunglasses cleaning products like a microfiber cloth, or a sun glass cleaner.
- Avoid leaving your sunglasses in extreme heat or cold, like a car.
- Don't touch the lenses of the sunglasses, the oils on your hands can cause damage.
- Use a protective case for your sunglasses.

More modern reflective coatings usually have several alternating layers of specific thickness, made of dielectric materials and sometimes metals. The metal layer can be made from titanium, nickel or chromium, or from an alloy like nichrome or Inconel, and has thickness ranging from 0.5 to 9 nanometers. The dielectric layer comprises a suitable oxide, e.g. chromium oxide, silicon dioxide, or titanium dioxide; its thickness determines the reflective properties of the resulting dielectric mirror. The manufacturing process is similar to making anti-reflective coating, and mirror and anti-reflective coatings can be deposited in the same sequence of operations.

== History ==
The main purpose of sunglasses has been, and still is, protection from the Sun's damaging UV rays. Throughout history, progression of the sunglasses began to change to serve more as a fashion stable, than eye wear for sun protection. The term "sunglasses" began being used around the 1900s. Before then, sunglasses were being used for more extreme weather conditions, like for polar explorers or for people visiting equatorial colonies.

The creation of the reflective material, Polaroid, was constructed by Edwin H. Land. These reflective sunglasses worked by bouncing the light off using the reflective material. This would keep away the sun's rays from the sunglasses and the wearer's eyes. Most glasses also had some sort of dark tint, providing extra shade and protection from the sun.

In WW2, Ray-Ban had used the anti-glare technology created by Edwin H. Land. Ray-Bans were a much better substitute than goggles for the fighter pilots in WW2. The goggles did not serve the pilots much protection from the sun, thus weakening their performance. When in higher altitudes, the goggles would also be damaged by freezing over. The new design of the cockpit allowed the goggle design to be thrown out completely and allow Ray-Bans to be the main source of protection.

=== Cyberpunk ===
Cyberpunk can be classified as a sub-genre of science fiction, normally a futuristic society that deals heavily with technology. Mirrored glasses have become a staple for the cyberpunk culture and style. Popular movies like The Matrix and Terminator could be seen using cyberpunk themes. One of the main characters of the movie The Matrix sports the mirrored sunglasses throughout the movie. One early cyberpunk short story anthology, edited by Bruce Sterling, is called Mirrorshades.

== See also ==
- Photochromic lens
