= Shwood Eyewear =

Eyewear company

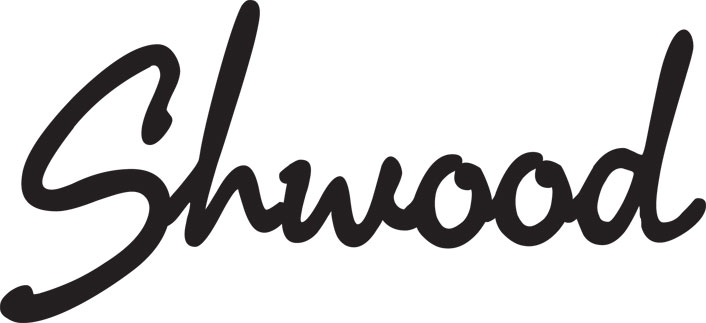
- Company type: Private
- Industry: Eyewear
- Founded: Portland, Oregon, United States (2009)
- Founder: Ryan Kirkpatrick, Eric Singer, Daniel Genco, Taylor Murray, Philip Peterson
- Headquarters: Portland, United States
- Products: Sun and Rx Eyewear
- Website: shwoodshop.com

Shwood Eyewear is an American brand of sunglasses and eyeglasses, founded in 2009, and based in Portland, Oregon.

== History ==
The prototype wooden glasses were developed in 2005 by Eric Singer, the idea was then shared with Ryan Kirkpatrick, Daniel Genco, Taylor Murray and Philip Peterson. The prototype was made using madrone tree, a pair of rusty cabinet hinges and salvaged lenses from a thrift store. Singer wore them to a skatepark and immediately got his first orders at $20 a frame.

The name Shwood comes from the name of a fake sponsor created by a friend of Singer to be able to enter a snowboarding competition.

Shwood Eyewear formally launched in 2009. Shwood began its operations in a 7 × 15-ft. workspace, as soon as expansion became feasible they moved to a 30 × 50-ft. shop space. In 2010, they further expanded and moved to 6,000 square-foot facility in Portland. By 2011, operations had expanded to making 125 frames a day, and distribution was in 80 retail stores. By 2013, operations had expanded to making 300 frames a day.

In 2015, they introduced a frame cover material (veneer) made entirely of old newspapers. In 2016, they introduced frames made with feathers and flowers, and announced experimenting with many different materials to create new frames.

The product line consists of sunglasses and prescription eyeglasses. The frames are made out of wood, stone, acetate, titanium and brass.
