= VSP Vision Care =

Insurance company

- Formerly: CVS (California Vision Services)
- Company type: Private
- Industry: Vision insurance
- Predecessors: Alameda Contra Costa Optometric Society; Joint Council on Vision Care
- Founded: September 1955; 70 years ago in Oakland, California
- Founder: Bernhardt N. Thal
- Headquarters: Rancho Cordova, California, US
- Number of locations: 34,000 (2016)
- Areas served: United States, Australia, Canada, Ireland, and the UK
- Key people: Michael Guyette (President and CEO of VSP Global); Michelle Skinner (Chief Provider & Industry Relations Officer)
- Products: Vision insurance, eyeglass frames and lenses
- Production output: 19 million frames (2017)
- Brands: Eye Designs, Eyeconic, Eyefinity, VSP Optics Group, Marchon Eyewear, Altair Eyewear, VisionWorks
- Members: 85 million (2017)
- Subsidiaries: Marchon Eyewear, Inc., Office Mate, Altair Eyewear, Visionworks
- Website: vspglobal.com

Vision Service Plan, doing business as VSP Vision Care, is a vision care health insurance company operating in the United States, Australia, Canada, Ireland, and the United Kingdom. It is structured as a doctor-governed organization and operates through five main businesses: eye care insurance, eyewear, lenses and lens enhancements, ophthalmic technology, and services designed to strengthen the relationship between patients and their eye doctors. As of 2017, VSP served approximately 80–85 million members worldwide and is the largest vision insurance provider in the United States.

The company was founded in September 1955 by a group of optometrists in Oakland, California as California Vision Services, a nonprofit organization. It grew to became a national provider and expanded internationally by 2007. In 2003, the Internal Revenue Service (IRS) revoked VSP’s tax-exempt status, citing exclusionary, members-only practices and high executive compensation.

== International expansion ==
=== Canada ===
In late 2007, VSP began to venture into Canada where it had served only Canadian-based employees of U.S. firms. By 2012, VSP covered approximately 2,000 Canadians. In 2013, VSP Vision Care Canada entered into a partnership with FYidoctors, a private, optometry-owned eyecare provider with more than 400 optometrists at 212 locations throughout Canada. VSP would market, sell and administer its vision care insurance platform to employers across Canada.

=== United Kingdom and Ireland ===
In 2013, VSP expanded to the United Kingdom and Ireland, doing business as VSP Neighbourhood Eyecare, similar to the Australia and Canada ventures. VSP partnered with the Association of Optometrists (AOP), National Eyecare Group (NEG); the U.K. branch of Italy's Assicurazioni General S.p.A. insurance provider, Generali U.K.; and Thomsons Online Benefits, which specializes in helping companies around the world run their employee benefits programs.

== Acquisitions ==
In July 2008, VSP announced its acquisition of the Ft. Lauderdale, Fla.-based Ultra Lens lab and partnered with the optical lab Perfect Optics in California.

In August 2008, VSP acquired the Melville, New York company Marchon Eyewear Inc. for $735 million with a combination of cash and debt after receiving regulatory approval from the California Department of Managed Care and the Connecticut Department of Insurance. The VSP-owned Altair Eyewear became a division of Marchon and remains in its Rancho Cordova headquarters. VSP also gained ownership of the frame company Allure Eyewear, as well as OfficeMate Software Solutions. Marchon manufactures and sells branded and proprietary eyewear and sunwear for such brands as Calvin Klein Collection, Calvin Klein platinum, Calvin Klein Jeans, Columbia Sportswear, Converse, Cutler and Gross, Donna Karan, Dragon, Flexon, Lacoste, Liu·Jo, Longchamp, Marchon NYC, Marni, MCM Worldwide, Nautica, Nike, Nine West, Salvatore Ferragamo, Sean John, Skaga, and Victoria Beckham. Under the terms of the acquisition, Marchon became a wholly owned subsidiary. Marchon operates from its New York-based headquarters as an independent entity within the VSP organization.

In 2019, VSP acquired Visionworks, an optical retailer in the U.S.

In September 2025, VSP agreed to buy Italian eyewear manufacturer Marcolin from PAI Partners and minority shareholders. In December 2025, it was announced the acquisition had been completed.

== Non-profit status ==
Text of Vision Service Plan v. United States is available from: CaseText

As early as 1999, the Internal Revenue Service (IRS) had started to look into VSP and its non-profit status. It all came to a head when an article printed in Optometric Management revealed the financial information of VSP. The article claimed that VSP reported on its website that in 2002 revenues were $1.86 billion and that it provided eyecare coverage for one in eight persons living in the United States. VSP said that along with this growth, payments to doctors are increasing and systems are being implemented to raise O.D. margins. However, an increasing number of O.D.s claimed that margins were actually cut, and administrative requirements made so burdensome that they have or were considering dropping VSP. They wondered why financial and operational decisions that affect optometrists across the country (for example, the WellVision Savings Statement) were made without their input.

In 2005, a federal district judge in Sacramento, California found that VSP failed to prove that it was not organized for profit nor for the promotion of the greater social welfare, as is required of a 501(c)(4). Instead, the district court found, VSP operates much like a for-profit (with, for example, its executives getting bonuses tied to net income) and primarily for the benefit of its own member/subscribers, not for some greater social good and, thereafter, concluded it was not entitled to tax-exempt status under 501(c)(4).

In November 2005, the parties presented cases before a federal district judge. VSP asked to be confirmed as a social welfare organization under 26 U.S.C. §501(c)(4) and asked for return of the 2003 tax payments and an order that the United States issue it a private letter recognizing VSP's 501(c)(4) status. The government asked for summary judgment on the grounds that VSP did not qualify for tax exemption under 501(c)(4). Judge Lawrence Karlton ruled against VSP on December 12, 2005. VSP argued that it qualified for exemption under 501(c)(4) because its operations were primarily for the promotion of social welfare through direct (contracted) services to broad segments of the community as well as through charity work. While Judge Karlton described VSP's charitable work as admirable, he found that VSP failed to establish it operated primarily for the promotion of civic betterments and social improvements within the meaning of the tax regulations.
