= Ic! berlin =

German eyewear company

ic! berlin brillen GmbH
- Company type: Private
- Industry: Eyewear
- Founded: 1996; 30 years ago
- Founder: Ralph Anderl
- Headquarters: Berlin, Germany
- Products: Optical and sunglasses frames
- Owner: Independent (1996–2023); Marcolin (2023–present)
- Number of employees: 180 (2015)
- Website: www.ic-berlin.com

ic! berlin brillen GmbH is a German eyewear company based in Berlin. Founded in 1996 by Ralph Anderl, it produces eyewear from 0.5 mm thick stainless spring steel sheet metal using a hinge design that avoids the use of any screws, welds, or glue in the construction of their frames.

In November 2023, it was announced that Marcolin had completed the acquisition of ic! berlin.

== History ==
In 1996, Ralph Anderl joined Philipp Haffmans and Harald Gottschling to help market their idea for screwless sheet metal eyewear in Berlin. Unable to sell the idea, the trio founded HGA Gesellschaft to produce and market eyewear under the brand ic! brille. (Note: Pronounced "I See Brille") The first frame to be produced was ‘Jack’, weighing 20 grams, with an initial run of 50 pieces.

ic! brille became ic! berlin in late 1997. Starting in a small apartment with a shop front in Max-Beer-Straße in Berlin-Mitte, ic! berlin moved to the nearby Backfabrik in 2005. While Haffmans and Gottschling focused on design and production, Anderl would take control of finance, organization and distribution. In 2003, the trio split, with Anderl remaining at ic! berlin as the sole Managing Director. That same year, Harald Gottschling and Philipp Haffmans embarked on a new venture. Joining forces with Daniel Haffmans and Moritz Krüger, they founded MYKITA, another eyewear brand.

Under Anderl, ic! berlin has expanded into fashion, launching a line of jeans and collaborating with other designers and fashion labels such as Kix, A Bathing Ape, Luisa Hecking and Superfine. In 2013, German artist and entertainer Friedrich Lichtenstein took up residency at ic! berlin as an ornamental hermit.

In November 2017, Ralph Anderl sold a majority stake in ic! berlin to the German investment company Premium Equity Partners.

Today, ic! berlin has over 180 craftsmen, engineers, and technicians who design, build, and market the company's original eyewear designs across 60 countries in Europe, North America, and Asia. The company's flagship store is located at Münzstraße 5 – 10178 Berlin, Germany.

== Awards ==
- 2008 Golden Silmo Eyewear Award, France/Paris
- 2008 Eyewear of the Year 2009/IOFT, Tokyo/Japan
- 2009 Eyewear of the Year 2010/IOFT, Tokyo/Japan
- 2010 Eyewear of the Year 2011/IOFT, Tokyo/Japan
