= Eyewear =

Items and accessories worn on or over the eyes

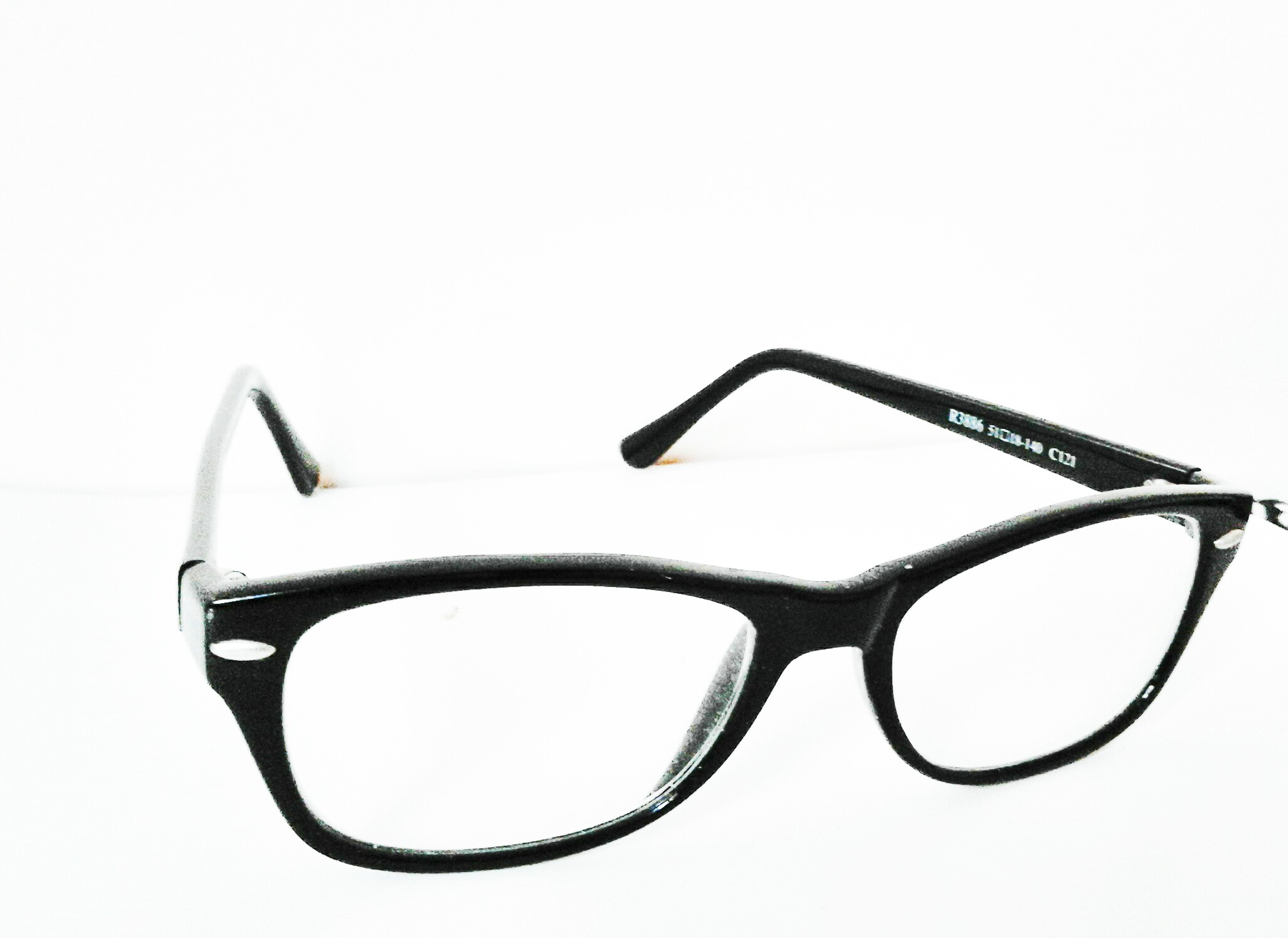
Modern glasses, the most dominant form of eyewear

Eyewear is a term used to refer to all devices worn over both of a person's eyes, or occasionally a single eye (therefore known as a monocle), for one or more of a variety of purposes. Though historically used for vision improvement and correction, eyewear has also evolved into eye protection, for fashion and aesthetic purposes, and starting in the late 20th century, computers and virtual reality.

The primary intention of wearing eyewear can vary based on the need or desire of the wearer. Eyewear comes in different forms, such as glasses, contact lenses, sunglasses and many more. Eyewear (such as glasses and contact lenses) helps most people see clearer or read. Eyewear also can be used for protection, such as sunglasses which protect wearers from the Sun's ultraviolet rays which are damaging to the eyes when unprotected, eyepatches to protect injured eyes from further damage, or goggles which protect the wearer's eyes from debris, water and other chemicals. Variants of eyewear can conversely inhibit or disable vision for its bearers, such as blindfolds and view-limiting device for humans, blinkers for horses, or blinders for birds, especially poultry. Eyewear also exists for other specialized or niche purposes, such as active shutter 3D systems and anaglyph 3D glasses for stereoscopy, and night-vision goggles for low-light environments.

The eyewear industry is estimated to be valued at US$100 billion as of May 2018. Much of the eyewear industry's prominence and use in fashion occurred in Western cultures during the 1950s, with individual designers and celebrities at the time wearing them in public and increasing the popularity of eyewear, especially sunglasses. The growth of the industry through the latter half of the 20th century is credited to Luxottica, generally credited with acquiring brands popular with Western culture such as Ray-Ban, Persol, and later Oakley, raising their prices and increasing the perceived status of eyewear in society. The 2010s and early 2020s saw a slowly-more technical focus towards the utility of eyewear, with early experiments such as Google Glass, Microsoft HoloLens and later Apple Vision Pro bringing augmented reality to eyewear; virtual reality headsets also began a growth in popularity in the 2010s.

== Innovation history ==
=== Pre-modern innovations ===
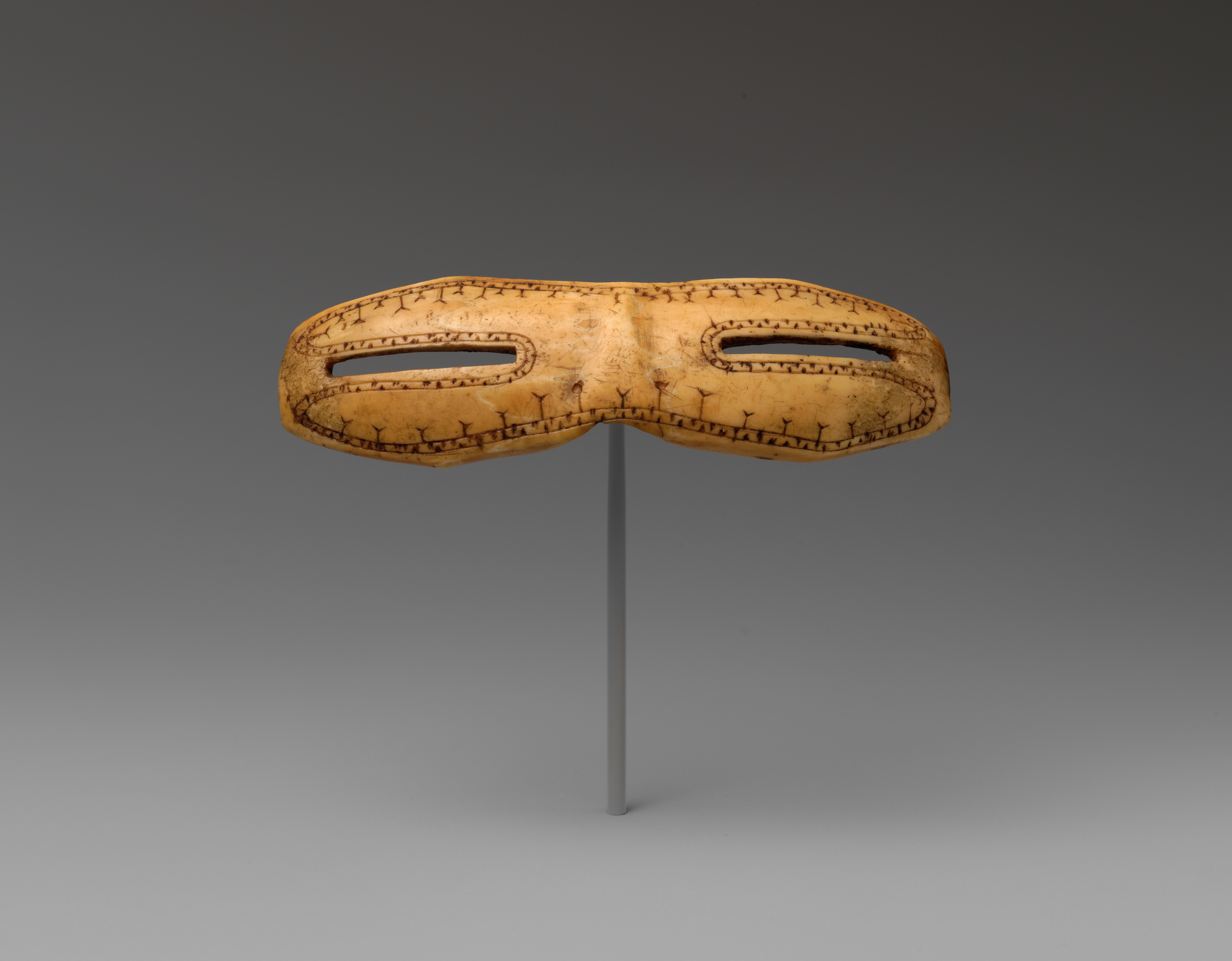
Early goggles used by the Inuit to prevent photokeratitis

Quartz was among the earliest used materials for reading stones, the precursors to wearable optics; quartz also became the foundation for glasses, the first major form of eyewear. The first incarnations of glasses were made with the aim of providing aid to reading.

Though innovations in pre-modern eyewear technology occurred in both Imperial China and the Inuit territories, which both invented early forms of sunglasses and goggles, Venice and Northern Italy have historically been the place of consolidation for eyewear innovation in the Western world. Upon the release of the printing press and the mass adoption of literature, larger sectors of the population began to buy into eyewear to assist with reading. Eyewear frames around this time were mainly made of animal bones, horns and fabric; the implementation of wire frames in the 16th century further allowed glasses to be mass-produced. The 16th century also saw the earliest ancestors of pince-nez eyewear, which secured itself to the wearer through "pinching" the nose and later would become popular in the 18th and 19th centuries.

=== Temple eyeglasses ===
The first half of the 18th century saw British optician Edward Scarlett perfect temple eyeglasses which would rest on the nose and the ears. The innovations presented by Scarlett would not only spark some to look at aesthetic customization of eyewear for fashion within Europe but also lead Benjamin Franklin to invent bifocals in colonial America. Later in the middle of the century, Britain also saw its first popularized wave of sunglasses as James Ayscough created and sold blue and green tinted sunglasses for general vision improvement.

=== Virtual reality and similar advancements ===
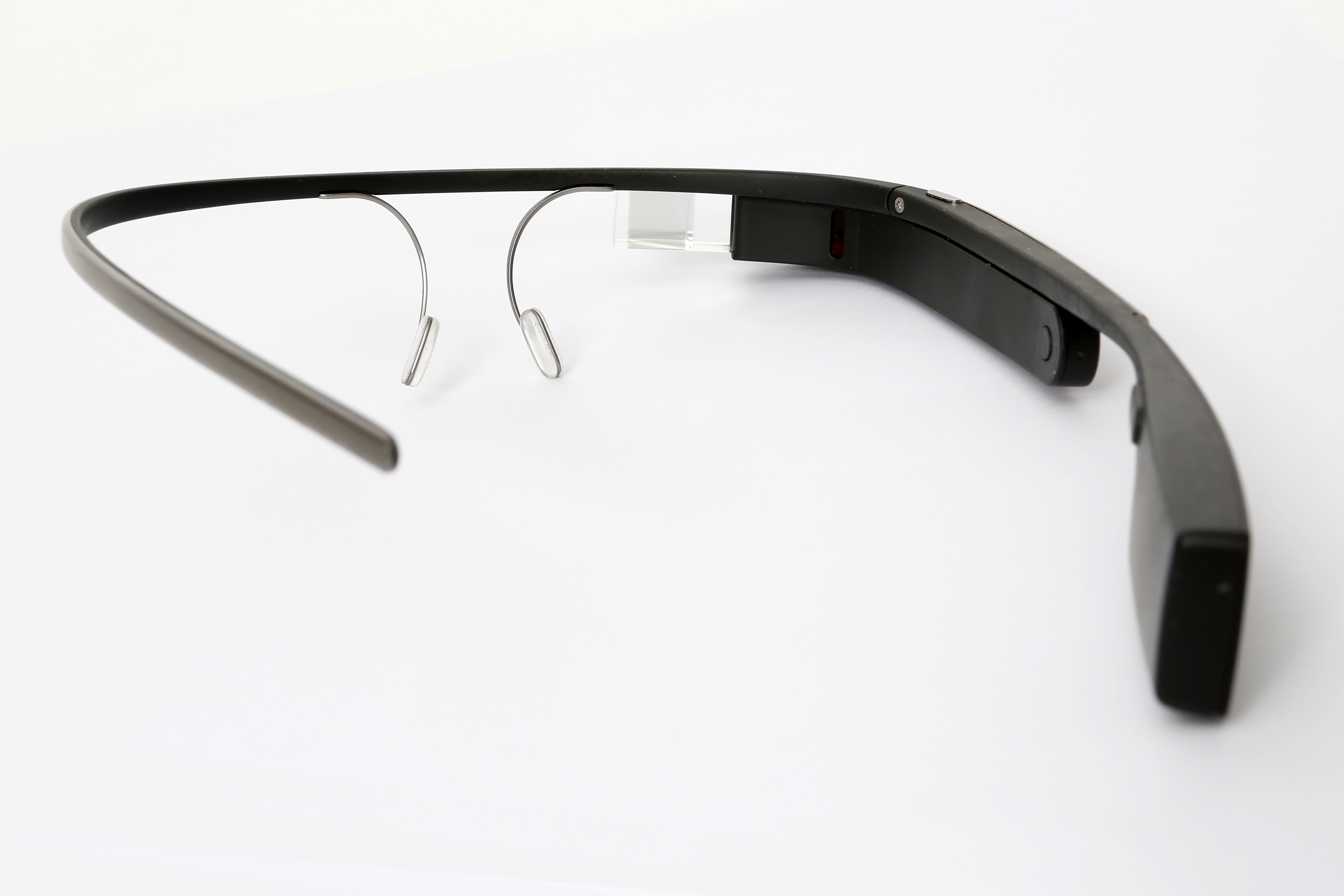
A Google Glass unit as viewed from the rear

Virtual reality slowly became a more prominent technology stating in the 1990s after refinement of 1950s prototypes pushed by NASA and other technology companies. Sega was among the first companies to introduce head-mounted virtual reality headsets for theme park rides at Joypolis locations. The first major jump in virtual reality, however, was with the Oculus Rift, later evolving into the Quest line made by Facebook-owner Meta Platforms. The success of the Rift later incentivized other tech companies like Sony (through its PlayStation brand) and HTC to release their own competitors to Oculus; Microsoft, Google, and Apple also all released or announced products throughout the 2010s and early 2020s in the eyewear technology industry incorporating mixed reality.

== History of the industry ==
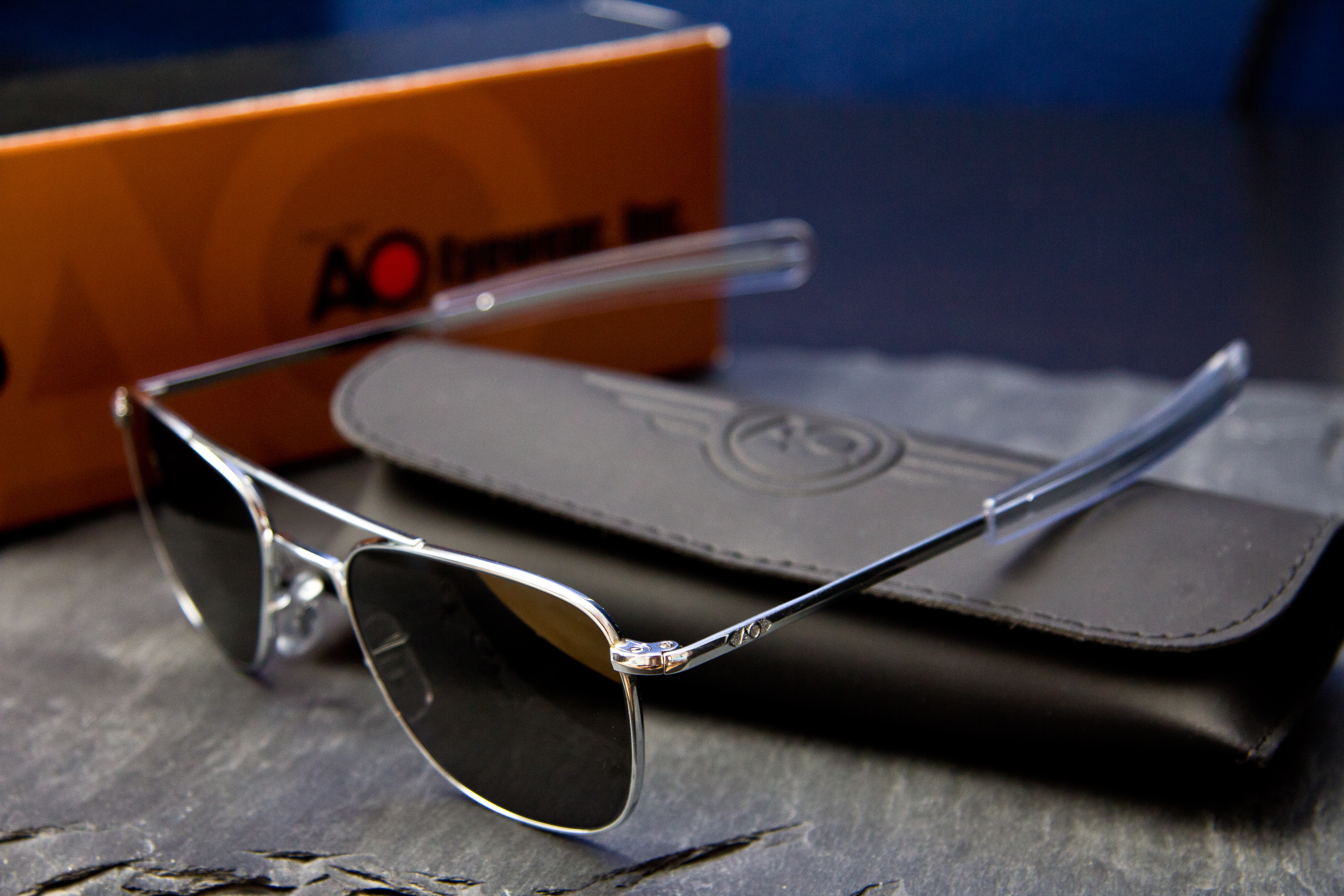
Aviator-style sunglasses made by American Optical

=== Surge in popularity ===
Despite earlier developments, eyewear began its surge in popularity in 1929. Foster Grant, which first went into business this year, was among the earliest large retailers for eyeglasses in the United States, setting up shop on the Atlantic City Boardwalk in New Jersey. The United States Army Air Corps was among the first large clients for sunglasses when it worked with Bausch + Lomb to create sunglasses which protected its pilots from glare. These sunglasses later evolved into aviator sunglasses, and the resulting name and brand, Ray-Ban, became synonymous with army pilots and later on a fashion item.

Foster Grant continued contributing to the growth of the eyewear industry for fashion by running large campaigns featuring celebrities. By the 1960s, the company had become synonymous with eyewear in America and was the dominant producer of sunglasses in the Western world. Ray-Ban had also become a large leader in sunglasses around this time, with its aviator style and later Wayfarer style taking off in popularity.

Mass-market eyewear experienced a popularity drought in the 1970s due to the dawn of luxury brands like Dior and Yves Saint Laurent entering the industry, though Ray-Ban began to experience cultural revival during the 1980s due to adoption by Hollywood celebrities both inside and outside of movies.

=== Consolidation into Essilor and Luxottica ===
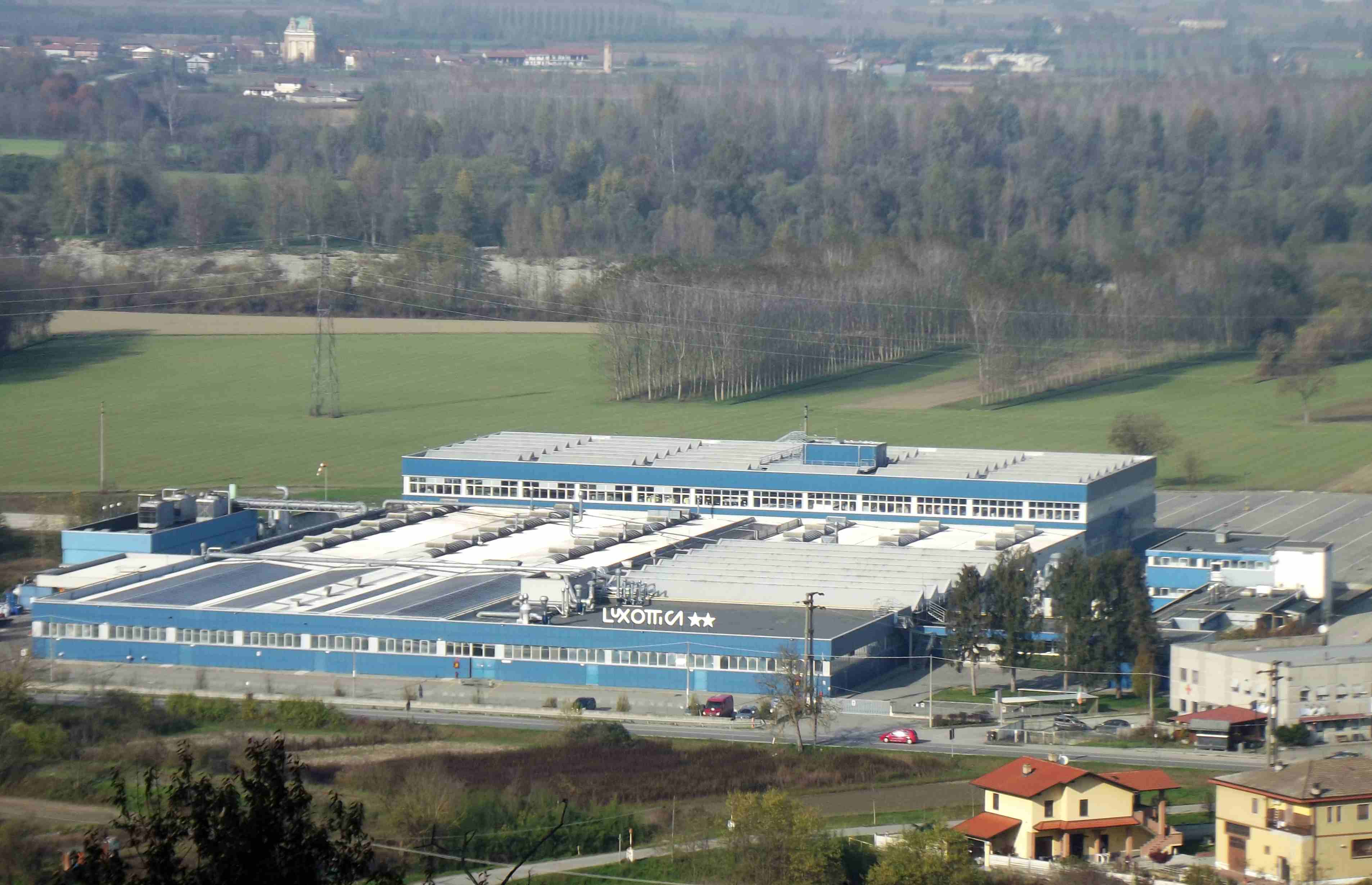
A Luxottica factory in Laurino, Italy

1971 saw the rise of the Italian company Luxottica into the scene when founder Leonardo Del Vecchio launched his finished eyeglasses at the Milan International Optics Exhibition. The next two decades saw Luxottica, at this point exclusively focusing on sunglasses, grow within Europe and slowly begin to buy up sunglasses brands and retailers; 1988 saw its first major licensing deal to produce sunglasses for Giorgio Armani. By the year 2001, Luxottica had acquired retailers LensCrafters and Sunglass Hut; the company additionally acquired the entirety of Persol in 1995 for an undisclosed amount and Ray-Ban from Bausch + Lomb in 1999 for US$640 million.

The Italian eyewear firm pulled Ray-Ban across all of the United States in order to re-engineer the product and markup Ray-Ban as a premium sunglasses brand, pushing for a global expansion afterwards; Luxottica additionally pushed Ray-Ban into far Eastern markets to diversify the brand's appeal beyond the Western World.

Luxottica's rise also occurred concurrent to a battle between the United Fruit Company (today Chiquita) and Goody Brands for the remaining stock of Foster Grant. Both contenders eventually lost out to the German chemicals firm Hoechst AG after each company pulled out due to non-eyewear related factors. In 2006, French prescription lens maker Essilor bought Foster Grant, then reorganized into a Nasdaq-traded holding company named FGX International for $465 million.

About a year after Essilor acquired Foster Grant, Luxottica further acquired sports eyewear manufacturer Oakley in 2007 for US$2.1 billion. The acquisition followed a pricing dispute between the two companies, with Luxottica causing Oakley's stock price to plummet by pulling its product out of Luxottica-owned Sunglass Hut and LensCrafters. Later on in 2014 Essilor would buy up Costa Del Mar, a Daytona Beach-based sports eyewear manufacturer specializing in performance eyewear, especially for sport fishing.

In 2018, in a €48 billion deal, Essilor and Luxottica Merged, where Essilor bought Luxottica though Del Vecchio would co-lead the merged entity, which would rename itself to EssilorLuxottica. Luxottica proceeded to delist itself from the New York Stock Exchange and the Borsa Italiana.

=== Disruption from the internet and fashion houses ===
The internet, which first sparked interest in virtual reality, also incentivized the founding of Warby Parker, with it stating its express purpose for being founded was to combat the high markups charged by other eyewear companies. Warby Parker disrupted the eyewear market with its price point, as well as the ability to try on up to five of its glasses for free and order products online. Since then, several companies have made their mark and improved upon the concept. Nerdy Frames, part of the newer generation of disruptors, has enhanced the quality of frames and lenses offered at a lower price point. The use of virtual try-ons and extended home trials has opened the market.

Online technologies also led to a rise in the exposure of Luxottica's dominance over the eyewear industry, with CBS's 60 Minutes, CNBC, and Adam Ruins Everything all releasing episodes on the dominance that Luxottica has over eyewear.

In recent years, Kering has also pulled ahead into the eyewear industry by terminating its contract with Luxottica competitor Safilo and internalizing its eyewear manufacturing. Kering began its journey by negotiating a €90 million contract termination agreement with Safilo, and recruiting Safilo's former CEO to lead Kering Eyewear, a new subsidiary of the company dedicated to making homegrown eyewear products for its fashion houses. The French luxury conglomerate, which owns Gucci, Yves Saint Laurent, has since become the second largest company in eyewear and boasting a 20% share of the market as of 2020, trailing only Luxottica itself. In addition to manufacturing for its own brands and acquiring licenses for manufacturing eyewear owned by Cartier-owner Richemont, Kering also acquired previously independent eyewear companies as well to add to its roster, most notably Lindberg and Maui Jim. Similarly, to better compete against Kering's new vertical integration into eyewear, LVMH, which owns Louis Vuitton, Dior, Fendi and Bulgari ramped up efforts in its eyewear division Thelios, founded by LVMH in 2017, generally speculated as a move to compete against Kering in eyewear. LVMH also announced in 2023 that Bulgari, which had its eyewear crafted by Luxottica previously since 2003, would no longer use EssilorLuxottica as its eyewear manufacturer.

== Eyewear types ==
Types of Eyewear
(Eye)glasses / spectacles	Belay; Bifocals; Browline; Bug-eye; Cat eye; Chicken; GI; Groucho; Horn-rimmed; Lensless; Lorgnette; Opera; Monocle; Pince-nez; Pinhole; Rimless; Scissors; Shooting; Smart; Trifocals; Windsor; X-ray
Sunglasses	Aviator; Mirrored; Solar viewer; Shutter; Wayfarer
Goggles	Ballistic; Dark adaptor; Doggles; Fatal Vision; Foggles; Night-vision; Snow; Swedish; Upside down; Welding
Other	Blindfold; Blinder; Blinker; Contact; Eyepatch; Shutter system; VR headset

== Eyewear industry ==
Since the beginning of fashionable eyewear in the 20th century, much of the eyewear industry has been headquartered in either North America or Northern Italy, with early industry giants Foster Grant and Bausch & Lomb contracting with Hollywood and the U.S. Armed Forces respectively. During the Great Depression, both Bausch & Lomb and Polaroid Corporation founder Edwin H. Land experimented with polarization of lenses, intended to reduce glare; Bausch & Lomb's experiments delivered to American armed forces created the Ray-Ban brand.

Today, the eyewear industry is estimated to reach a valuation of around US$111 billion by 2026, and US$172 billion by 2028.

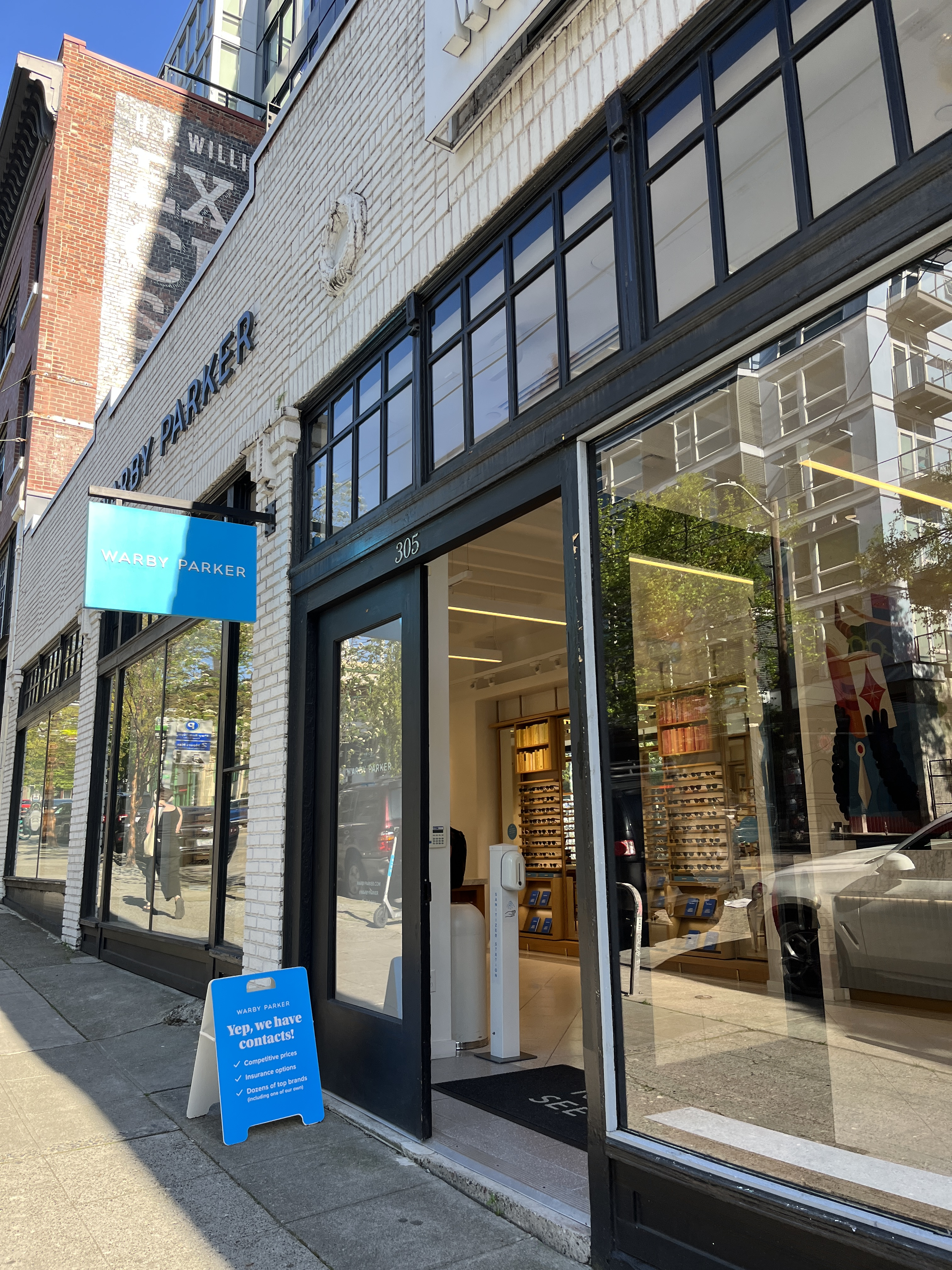
A Warby Parker store in Seattle

=== Eyewear retail ===
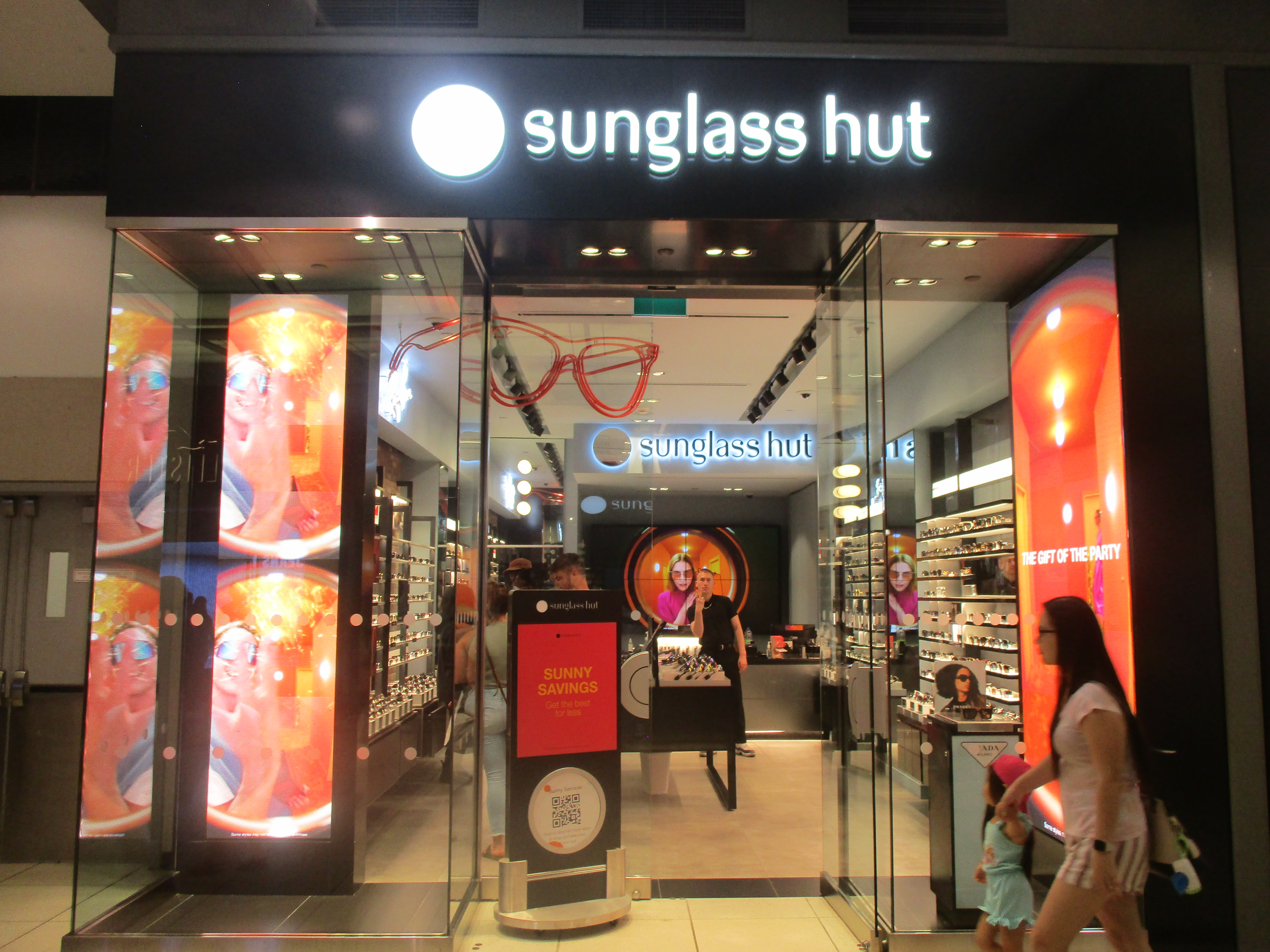
A Sunglass Hut store in Toronto

Eyewear retail is a steadily growing business, driven by the rising global population, economic development, increased consumer purchasing power, and the global prevalence of ocular diseases. The increased use of digital screens has led to an increase in vision impairment, cataracts, myopia, hypermetropia, eye irritation, dry eyes, computer vision syndrome and double vision. Sunglasses make up 42% of the global eyewear market as of 2020. They protect the eyes from sun damage and conjunctivitis, but are also sold as fashion accessories, with many consumers opting to have a number of sunglasses for different occasions.

EssilorLuxottica controls a dominant portion of the eyewear retail market. As of 2021, the largest single eyewear retail chain in the United States by sales revenue is Essilor subsidiary Vision Source, which sold US$2.672 billion in 2021. Chains controlled by the Luxottica division of EssilorLuxottica, which include LensCrafters and Sunglass Hut, made a combined US$2.41 billion that same year; the largest non-Luxottica chain by sales was National Vision Holdings, making US$2.080 billion.

Eyewear Industry Retail Sales in 2021
Company name	2021 Sales (millions of USD)	Retail brands owned	Refs
EssilorLuxottica	5,082	Vision Source; Sunglass Hut; LensCrafters; Pearle Vision; Target Optical; Ray-Ban; Oakley	
National Vision Holdings	2,080	AC Lens; America's Best; Eyeglass World; Walmart Vision Center; Vista Optical (Fred Meyer)	
Walmart	1,748		
Eyecare Partners	1,566		
Costco Optical	1402.7		
VSP Vision Care	1,140	Marchon Eyewear; Visionworks	
Capital Vision Services	1,108	MyEyeDr	
Warby Parker	534		

== See also ==
- Eyepiece
- Eyewear retailer
- Optical lens design
- Optometry
