= Panto glasses =

Eyeglasses design

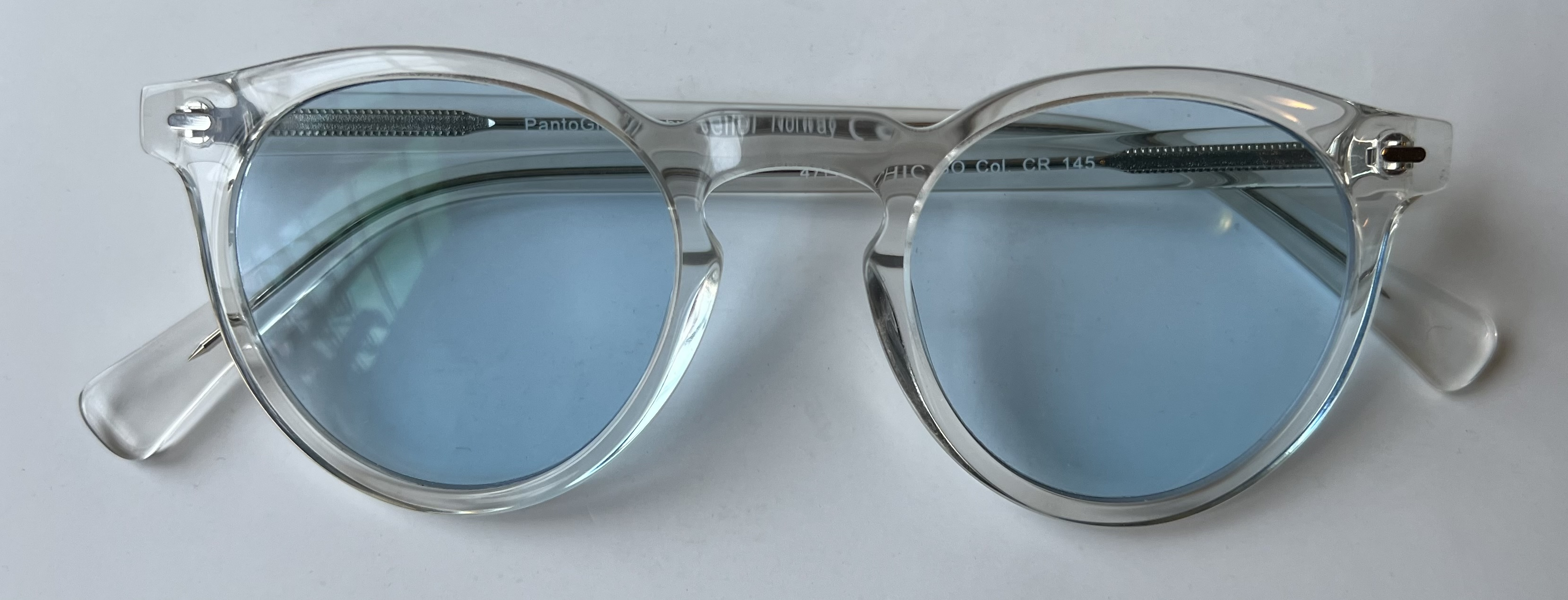
An example of panto glasses

Panto glasses are a type of eyeglasses with rounded-oval rims that are symmetrical about their vertical axis, with a slightly flattened upper edge and a fuller lower curve. The style is distinguished from circular and oval glasses by its combination of a flatter upper edge and fuller lower curve.

== History ==
Panto glasses were developed from earlier round-oval and pantoscopic spectacle forms used in 19th and early 20th century optical design and manufacturing.

By the early 1930s, panto frames were being used in commercial spectacle design. In Germany, Carl Zeiss introduced the Perivist system in 1932, which used high-set temples and pantoscopic lenses. Panto frames were available in Norway by around 1938.

The design continued in use after World War II. In the United Kingdom, panto glasses were among the spectacle styles worn by National Health Service users in the 1950s and 1960s.

By the 1980s, panto glasses had reappeared as a retro eyewear style. The style has continued to appear in eyeglasses and sunglasses collections.

== See also ==
- Windsor glasses
- Horn-rimmed glasses
- Sunglasses
