= Grody =

Grody is a surname. Notable people with the surname include:

- Bill Grody, American businessman
- Kathryn Grody (born 1946), American actress and writer
