= Ørgreen Optics =

Danish eyewear company

- Type: Private
- Industry: Eyewear
- Founder: Henrik Ørgreen, Tobias Wandrup, Gregers Fastrup
- Products: Prescription Eyeglasses, Sunglasses
- Website: orgreenoptics.com

Ørgreen Optics is a Danish eyewear company based in Copenhagen. They are most commonly known for their colour combinations, Danish design and Japanese-made titanium frames.

== History ==
Ørgreen was founded in 1997 by Henrik Ørgreen, Tobias Wandrup and Gregers Fastrup and was originally a sunglass brand. In 2002 the brand launched their first collection of prescription frames. Ørgreen produces optical frames, sunglasses and snow goggles. The company has retailers in more than 50 countries worldwide with HQ situated in Copenhagen

Ørgreen operate one flagship store located in Copenhagen, where the entire Ørgreen collection along with other high end brands are sold.

== Collaborations ==
In 2011 Ørgreen launched a special edition of the Arne Jacobsen Swan chair in collaboration with the furniture brand Republic of Fritz Hansen; named The Skyline Edition. The Swan chair, initially designed by the legendary Danish architect Arne Jacobsen in 1958, was restyled by Ørgreen and featured the Copenhagen skyline embroidered on the front.

In 2014, Ørgreen launched a limited edition collaboration with Danish menswear designer Asger Juel Larsen.
