= Rimless eyeglasses =

Type of eyeglasses

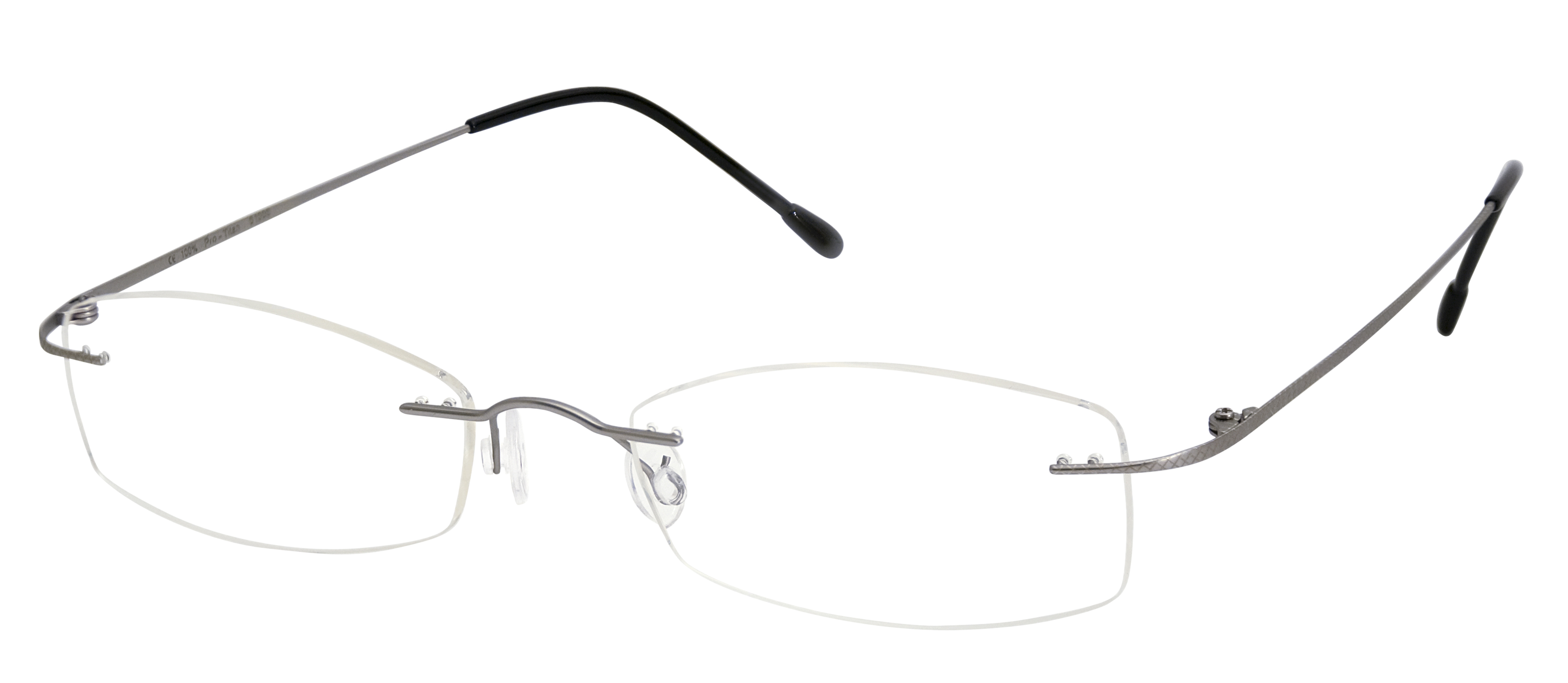
An example of contemporary, pressure-mounted three-piece rimless eyeglasses

Rimless eyeglasses are a type of eyeglasses in which the lenses are mounted directly to the bridge or temples. The style is divided into two subtypes: three-piece glasses are composed of lenses mounted to a bridge and two separate temple arms, while rimways (also called cortlands) feature a supporting arch that connects the temples to the bridge and provides extra stability for the lenses.

Rimless glasses were a popular style of eyeglasses from the 1880s until into the 1960s, and re-emerged in popularity in the latter part of the 20th century and early 21st century. Apple founder and former CEO Steve Jobs wore round rimless eyeglasses for 18 years, from 1993 until his death in 2011.

Despite these shifts, they are unique among eyeglass styles in that they have never gone completely out of fashion, remaining an acceptable alternative through the years to more stylish designs.

== Mounting methods ==
Rimless glasses lenses are held in place (or "mounted") by way of a series of screws, or hollow plastic double rivets (called "bushings" or "compression plugs") that fit into two holes in the lens. When bushings are used, the temples and bridge have barbed metal pins that lock into the bushings, creating a pressure seal that holds the lenses in place. Although they are more cosmetically appealing, the bushing method is more fragile than the screw and nut method, and more difficult for laypersons to repair themselves in the event of loosening or breakage. Bushing based rimless mounts are, however, designed so that the pins can pull out of the lenses without causing damage, which reduces repair cost and duration.

== History ==
=== Origins ===
The template for rimless eyeglasses date back to the 1820s, when an Austrian inventor named Johann Friedrich Voigtländer marketed a rimless monocle. The design as it is known today arose in the 1880s as a means to alleviate the combined weight of metal frames with heavy glass lenses. The style also came about from a desire to make eyewear as inconspicuous as possible; at the time, eyeglasses were not considered an acceptable fashion statement and carried connotations of one being elderly or a member of the clergy; historically, most eyeglass wearers needed them to correct presbyopia, and only clergymen tended to be literate enough to require reading glasses.

=== 1800s – 1920s ===
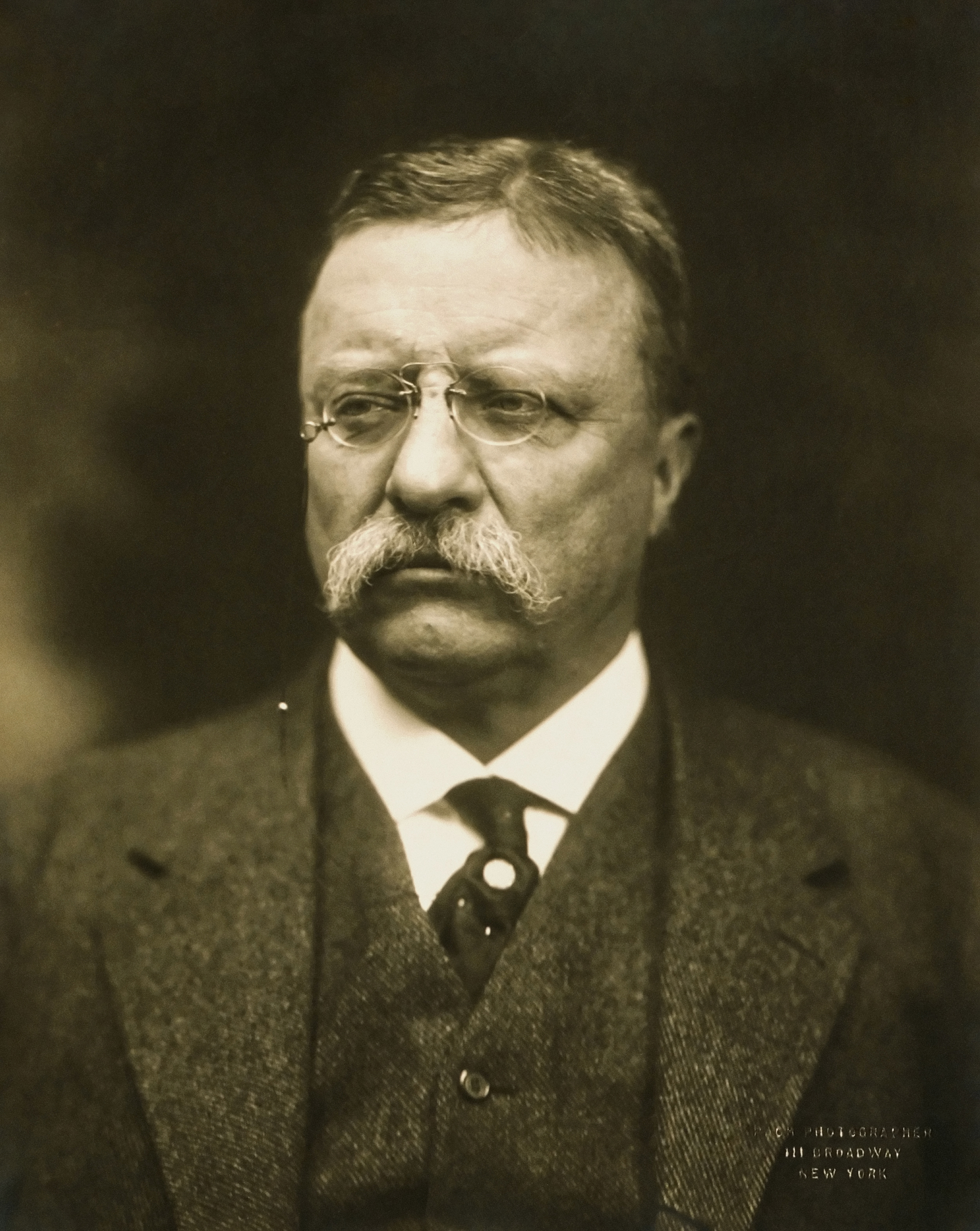
President Theodore Roosevelt in rimless pince-nez. Photos of Roosevelt wearing the glasses led to the initial popularization of rimless eyeglasses amongst Americans in the early 1900s.

Rimless glasses were first widely offered as pince-nez, with manufacturers arguing that the design was superior to extant eyeglasses because it secured the lenses directly to the nose and kept them in place. The style became popularized in the years prior to World War I by Theodore Roosevelt, whose popularity with the American people and public image as a frontiersman helped to eliminate some of the stigma associated with eyeglasses.

During this same period, another style became available in which the lenses were mounted to two arms as well as a bridge; the style became known as three-piece glasses for the three separate structural components. The most popular three-piece style was known as a riding temple, and was modeled after a style of eyeglasses favored by those who relied on horses for transportation. The style lacked nosepads, and featured small, oval lenses designed to sit flush with the face by way of the combined efforts of curved temples that conformed to the back of the wearer's ears and a curved nosepiece that conformed to the bridge of the nose. The design eliminated any obstruction of vision caused by eyeglass frames and also kept the glasses secure on the wearer's head.

=== 1920s – 1960s ===
As more optometrists began to diagnose astigmatism, the pince nez became less practical because of subtle shifts in the position of the lenses caused by the wearer moving their head. With the implementation of nosepads in 1920, the three-piece style surpassed the pince nez in popularity; the new design allowed wearers to adjust the position of glasses on the face, and also permitted for a wide variety of lens shapes, with optometrists offering over 300 options by 1940 (though variations on circles, ovals, and octagons, as well as panto glasses, remained most popular).

Also in the 1920s, a new style appeared in which an "arch" connected the bridge to the temples, to provide extra stability for the lenses; the mounting technique was referred to as "Shurset" ("sure set"). Although the design would be considered a variant of "semi-rimless" glasses in the latter part of the 20th century, the style was considered rimless upon its inception because no part of the lens was secured inside of a frame; modern semi-rimless eyewear features lenses partially secured inside of a half-frame, with the lower portion of the lens held in place by nylon wire. Though traditionally called "Rimways," this variation was also referred to as Cortland style. A variation utilizing only two screws and which only secured the lenses to the bridge was called the Numont or the Two Screw Cortland; the removal of the temporal screws was considered to be a cosmetic improvement.

During the 1940s, the United States Army adopted the numont as a style available to soldiers requiring eyewear. Although rounded, wire-rimmed frames were the most popular choice, some participants in World War II wore numonts.

Three-piece glasses with temples and nosepads remained popular from the 1920s until the end of the 1950s; during the same period, Rimway glasses began to edge them out in popularity, and once three-piece glasses had fallen out of favor, remained in style into the 1960s.

Hirohito, Emperor of Japan, wore oval rimless glasses during his reign.

=== 1980s ===
Rimless glasses became popular again in the latter part of the 20th century, particularly a brief renaissance in the 1980s. In the 1980s, Rimways were often featured in movies to indicate that a character was an intellectual; Wilford Brimley wore a pair as scientist Blair in The Thing, as did Corey Feldman while playing a child inventor in Friday the 13th: The Final Chapter. Paul Verhoeven chose a pair for Kurtwood Smith to wear as villain Clarence Boddicker in RoboCop specifically because the glasses' intellectual associations would clash with the character's violent personality, a contradiction that he believed recalled the similarly bespectacled Heinrich Himmler.

=== 2000s – 2010s ===
Three-piece glasses rose in popularity in the early 21st century with the implementation of lightweight titanium frames, which, coupled with polycarbonate lenses, made the glasses virtually weightless on the wearer's face. The favoring of rimless glasses by a variety of public figures also served to increase their popularity; in 2008, demand rose for rimless titanium glasses similar to those worn by Sarah Palin during public appearances during the 2008 United States Presidential Election. In 2011, the waning popularity of rimless glasses—which were being supplanted by horn-rimmed glasses—was invigorated following the death of Steve Jobs, whose round, rimless frames had become an iconic part of his appearance. In the weeks following Jobs' death, Robert Marc, the manufacturer who had designed Jobs' glasses in 1998, were inundated with requests for identical frames, to the point that the company had to place consumers on a three-month waiting list. Similarly, trade shows throughout the world—especially in Asia—quickly sold out as consumer demand rose for glasses like Jobs'.

== Durability and stability ==
Because they lack frames, rimless glasses can sustain damage more easily than other eyeglasses designs; eyeglass labs throughout the United States report that consumers are two to ten times more likely to require new lenses in three-piece frames than any other eyeglass design. This is nominally a result of the material used to produce the lenses: Although relatively durable inside of frames, CR-39 lacks impact resistance and cannot absorb the wear and tear of constant stress to the lenses caused by putting on, wearing, and removing glasses. Rimways fare much better with CR-39 because the arches absorb shock and stress. The implementation of polycarbonate—the material used to make bullet proof glass—in addition to making rimless glasses even lighter, reduces the glasses' fragility as polycarbonate can endure a great amount of stress and is highly impact resistant. To ensure both the longevity of the glasses and as a safety precaution, more optical labs are refusing to mount CR-39 lenses in rimless frames, and British optical labs have uniformly adopted a policy of only processing polycarbonate lenses for rimless frames.

== See also ==
- Browline glasses
- Cat eye glasses
- Horn-rimmed glasses
- Windsor glasses
