= Shooting glasses =

Type of eyewear for shooting sports

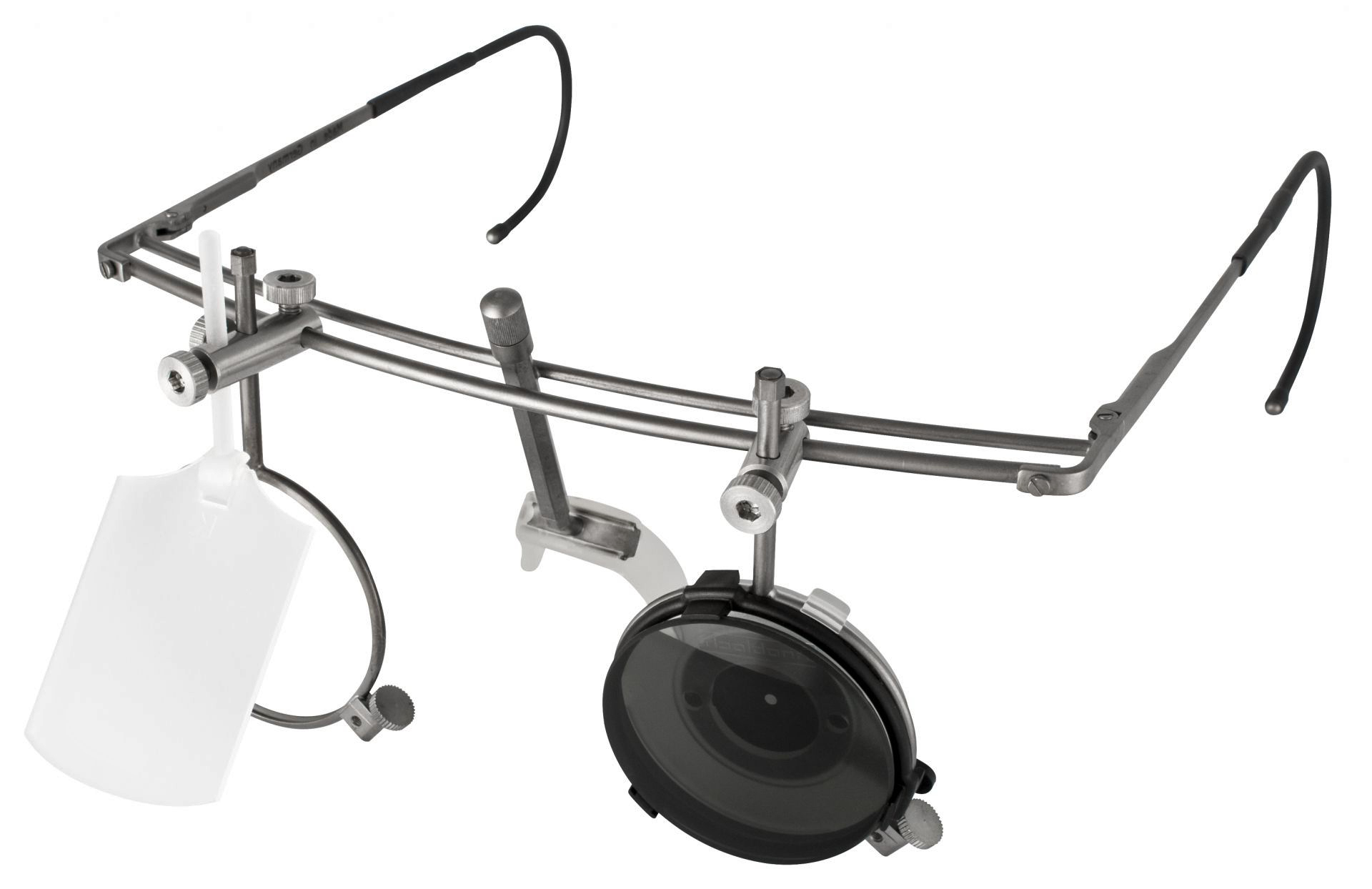
Shooting glasses are used as a visual aid for sport shooting. Though the glasses are extremely customizable, most pairs contain three basic elements: a lens, a mechanical iris, and a semi-transparent occluder. These components work together to help shooters focus their aiming eye on three points well enough to align the distant target with their gun's front and rear sight elements at the same time.

Shooting glasses are specialized corrective glasses for use in shooting and are used almost exclusively in sport shooting competitions. Like other glasses, they are worn in front of the eyes to compensate for the shooter's ametropia with optical lenses.

== Functions ==
In contrast to most other eye glasses, shooting glasses usually only have one lens that corrects the ametropia of the dominant eye, which is used for aiming. This lens is selected in such a way that the maximum visual acuity lies on the font sight line element near the muzzle of the (non-magnifying) open type or diopter and globe type match sight line elements to get three points positioned in three different optical planes in acceptably sharp focus at the same time. This is necessary because the shooter can influence the weapon and sight line elements and not the target. It is accepted that the target is not seen with maximal visual acuity when aligning the target with the front and rear sighting elements, especially with increasing age or when using open sights.

To avoid eye fatigue and improve balance the non-aiming eye should be kept open. The non-aiming eye can be blocked from seeing distractions by mounting a semi-transparent occluder. This is preferred to pinching the non-aiming eye in order to avoid the undesirable closing of the eyelid of the aiming eye and increased strain on the eyelid muscle.

The corrective lens for the aiming eye is attached to the eyeglasses frame and adjustable in three-dimensional space. This ensures that the aiming eye can look through the glass centrally and axially optimally adjusted to minimize optical distortions and hence distortions to the sighting image. The occluder for the non-aiming eye and other accessories mounted to the frame are also adjustable. The shooter positions the corrective lens correctly in front of their aiming eye and other accessories depending on their posture and preferences when shooting.

== Accessories ==
Accessories mounted on the highly adjustable shooting glasses frames consist of:

- Iris diaphragms to increase the depth of field and reduce reflections.
- Colored transparent insert discs to increase the contrast sensitivity.
- Semi-transparent occluder to block the non-aiming eye from seeing distractions.
- Glare shields to restrain light from the side or from above are considered permitted accessories.

== Sporting competitions ==
In principle, the correction of ametropia is permitted with all suitable means. This also applies to colored discs and iris diaphragms. The use of magnifying aiming optics is not allowed by the International Shooting Sport Federation.

For some shooting competition types, safety glasses are mandatory or expressly recommended as eye protection. Shooting glasses are also permitted as eye protection.

== Gallery ==
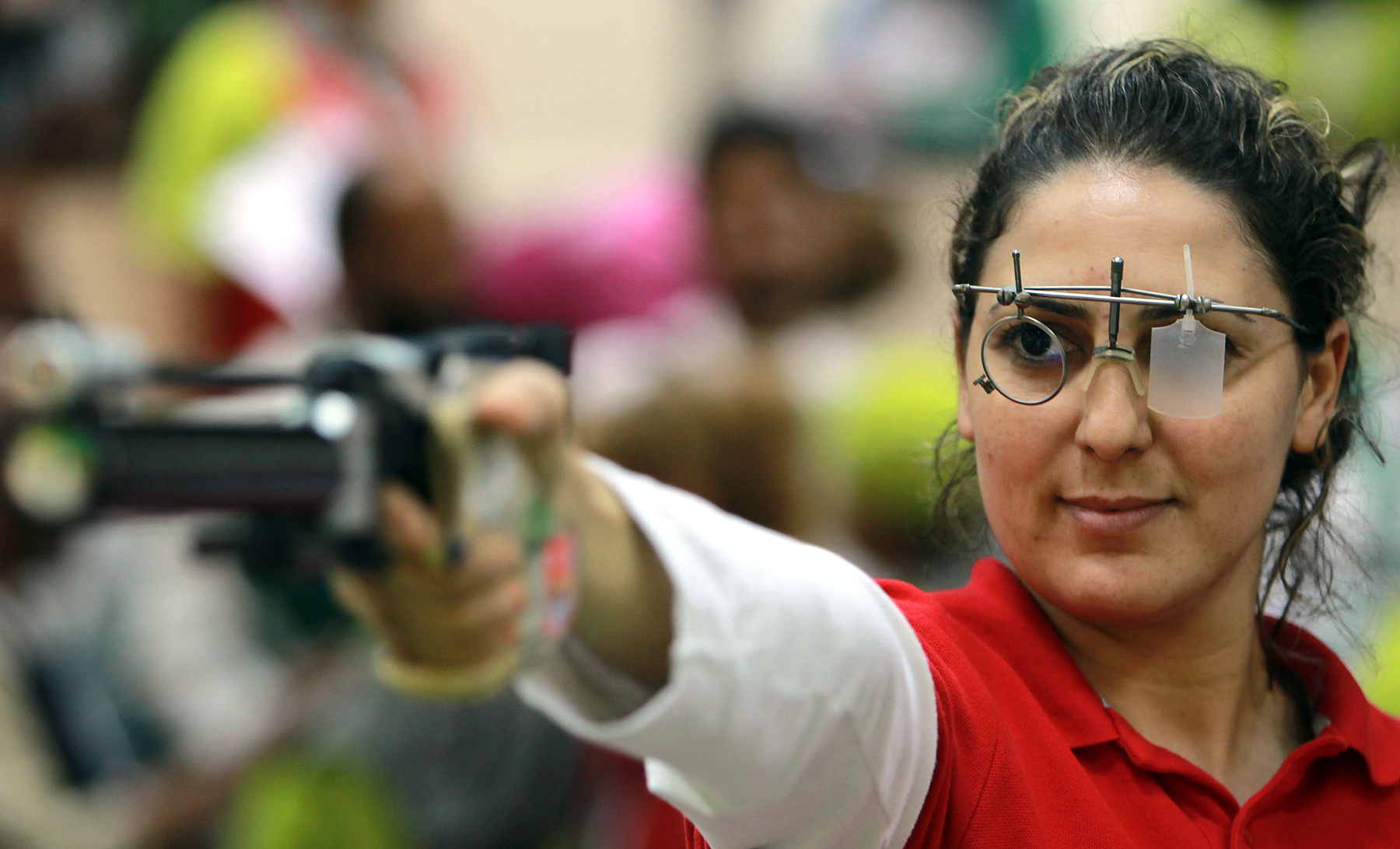
Olfa Charni wearing shooting glasses with a semi-transparent occluder for the non-aiming eye competing in a 10 m air pistol event.

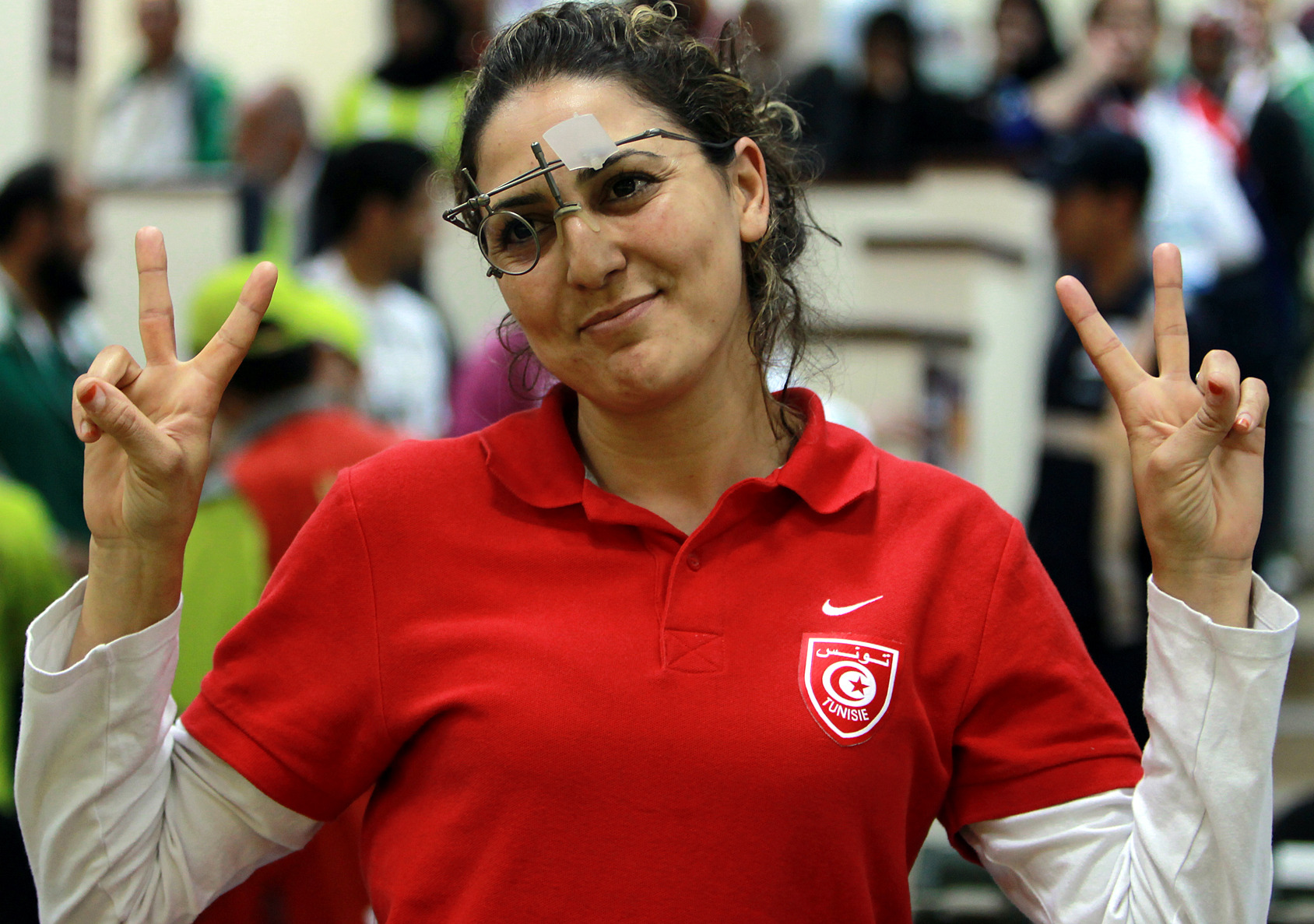
Olfa Charni wearing her shooting glasses with the semi-transparent occluder for the non-aiming eye flipped up.

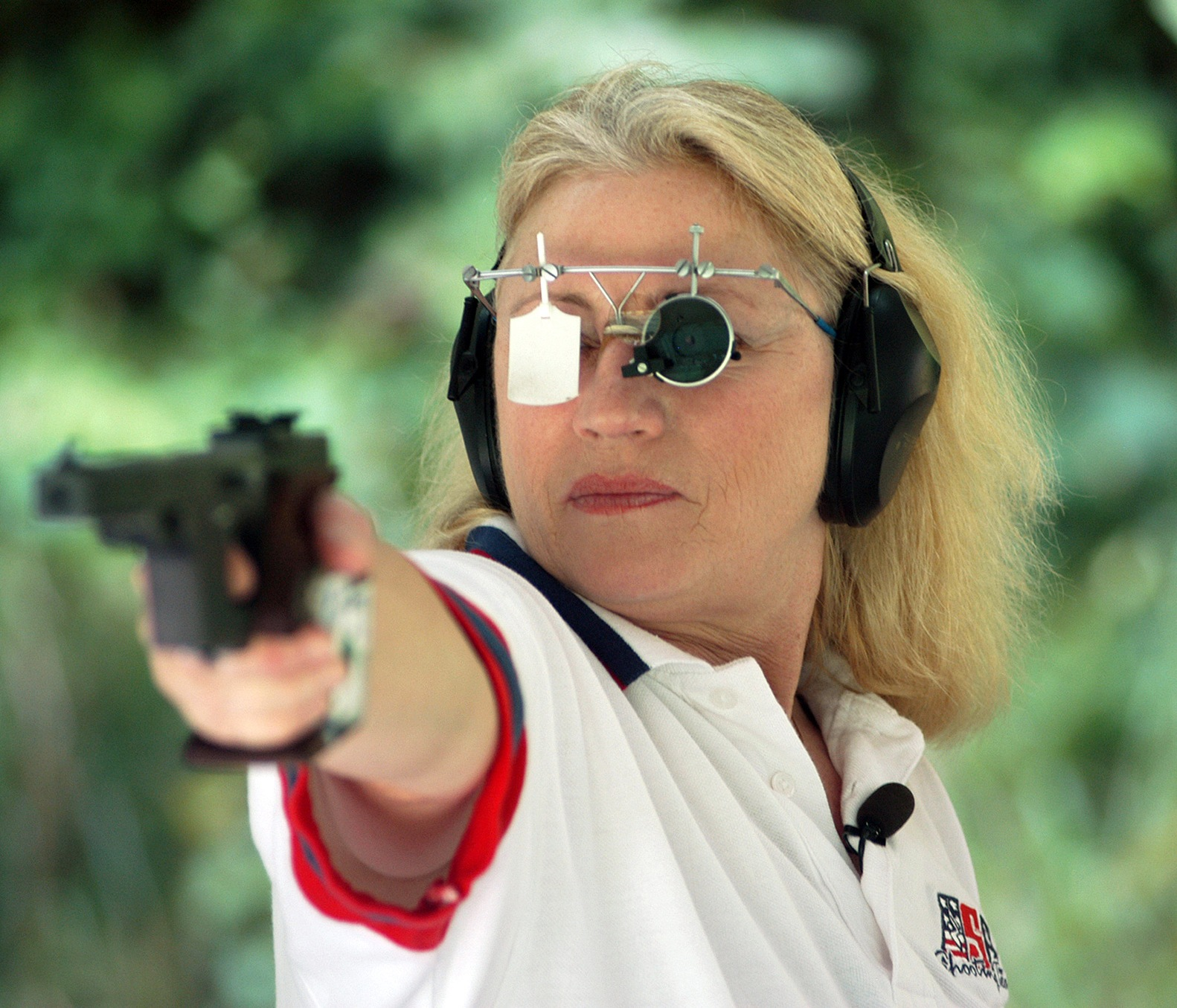
Elizabeth Callahan wearing shooting glasses with an iris diaphragm as a visual aid at a 25 m pistol event.

A 6 o'clock open pistol sight picture with focus on the front sight element; the out-of-focus gray dot represents the target.

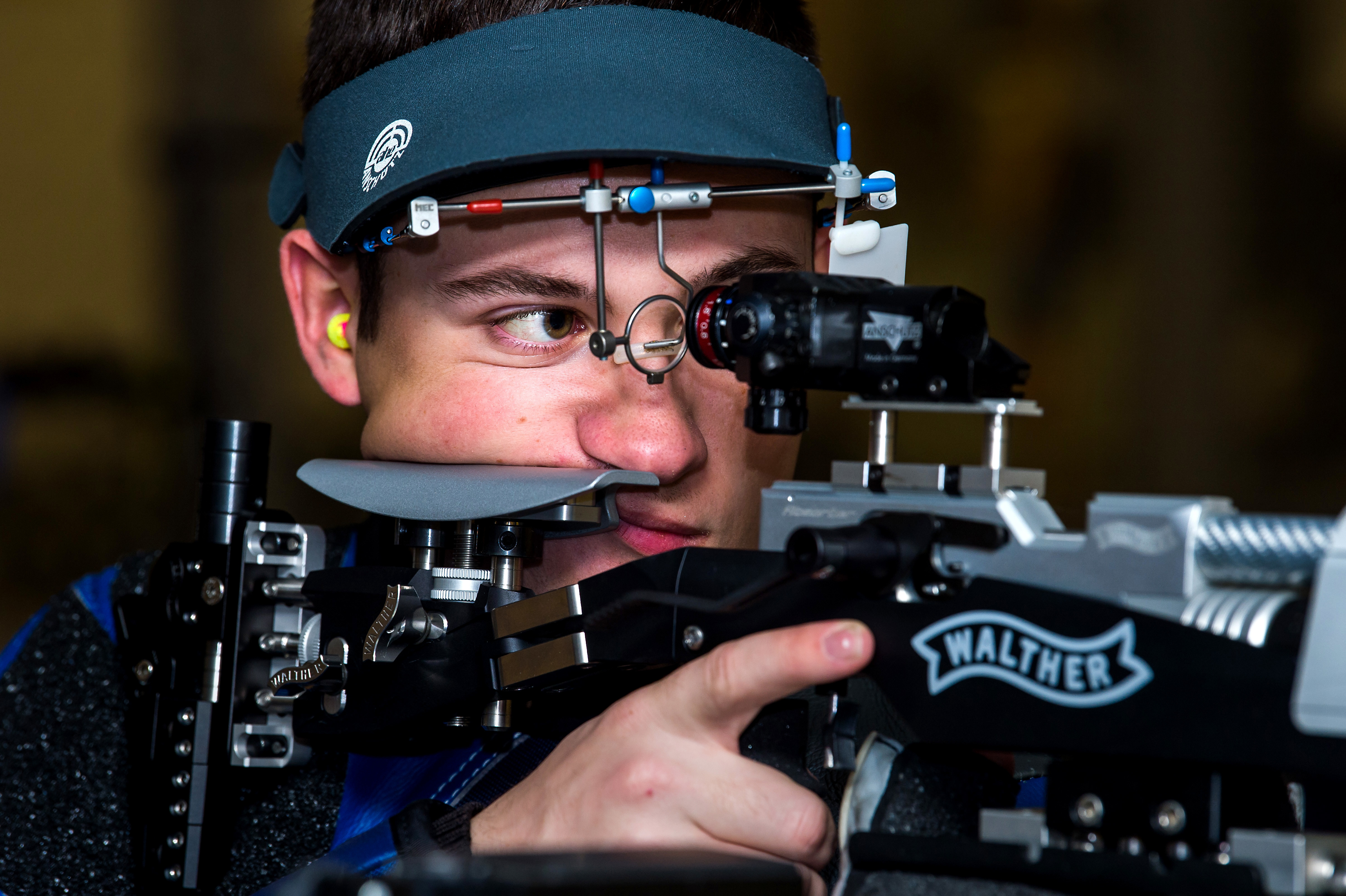
U.S. Air Force Academy Cadet Peter Fiori using corrective shooting glasses as a visual aid at a 10 m air rifle event.

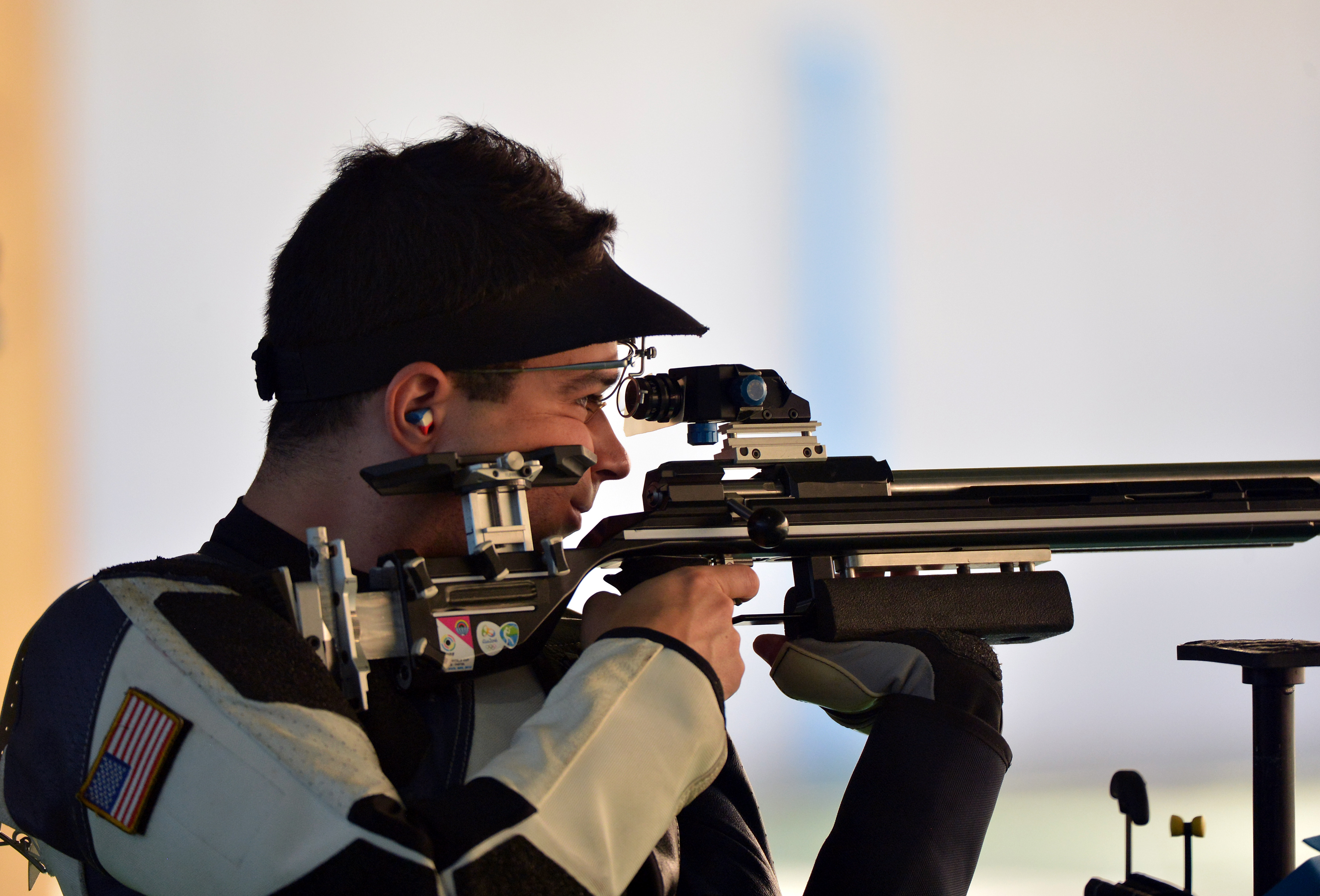
Daniel Lowe using corrective shooting glasses as a visual aid at a 50 meter rifle three positions event.

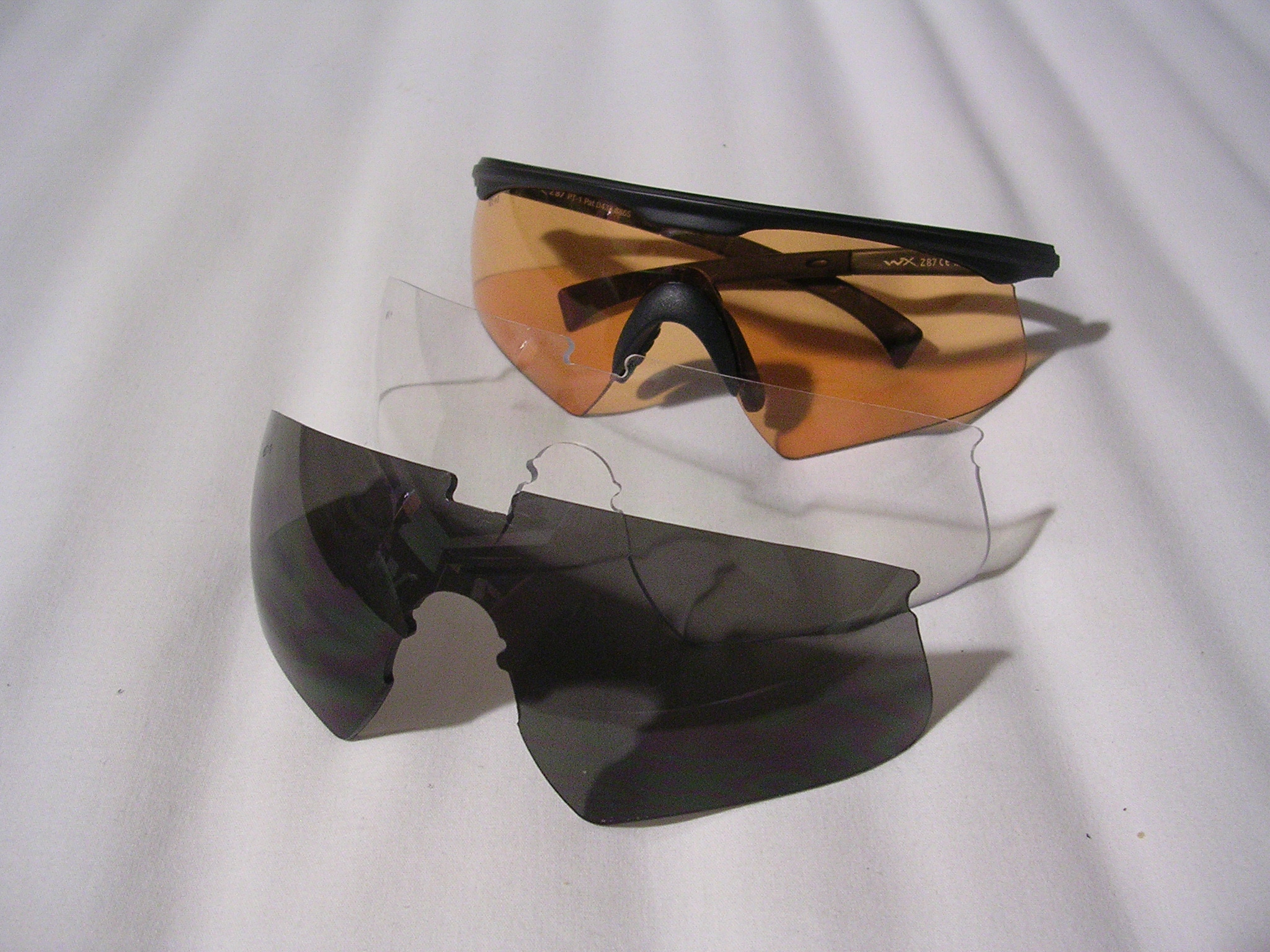
Shooting glasses with 3 available lens tints (gray-green, clear, and persimmon) used for eye protection and improving vision.

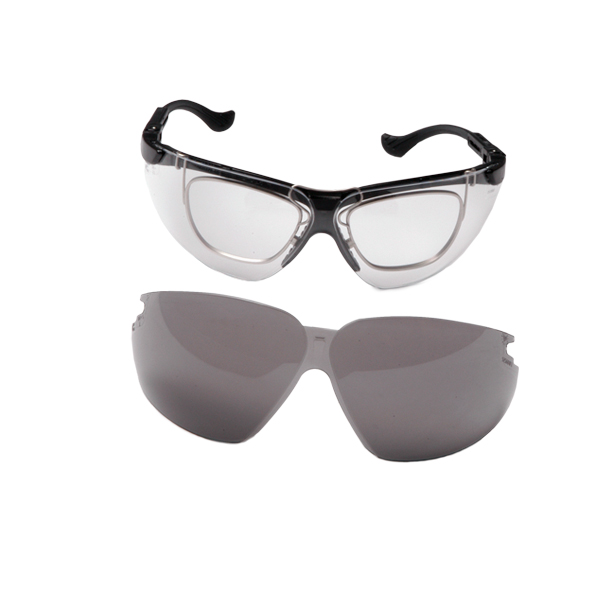
Shooting glasses with 2 available lens tints used for eye protection and improving vision with an inserted optional prescription lens carrier.
