= AC Lens =

- Type: Privately Held
- Industry: contact lens & eyeglass retail
- Founded: 1995
- Headquarters: Columbus, Ohio
- Key people: Peter Clarkson, CEO / President; Philip Dietrich, CTO; Brian Frank, Marketing Director; Robert Drumm, Marketing Manager
- Products: contact lenses & eyeglasses
- Website: aclens.com

AC Lens is a privately held company based in Columbus, Ohio that sells contact lenses, eyeglasses and vision care products online.

== Origin ==
Arlington Contact Lens Service, Inc (AC Lens) was formed in 1995 and launched in 1996 by Dr. Peter Clarkson in the back of an optometrist's office on the campus of Ohio State University in Columbus, OH. AC Lens incorporated in the State of Ohio in 1998. In 2000, AC Lens acquired I-Ohio LLC in an exchange of private stock. AC Lens now operates various websites including USA and United Kingdom based sites. Dr. Clarkson is a graduate of Southampton University in the UK and the Ohio State University College of Medicine.

On February 4, 2004, the Fairness to Contact Lens Consumers Act went into effect. This federal law requires that optical care providers release their patients' prescriptions to them. AC Lens was provided the opportunity to comment and suggest changes to the FTC on March 31, 2004. The final ruling on the law was released by the FTC in July 2004. In October 2004, the FTC released a A Guide for Prescribes and Sellers.

== Recognition ==
AC Lens has been named to the INC. 5000 and the Columbus Business First Fast 50. In May 2010, CEO Peter Clarkson was named a finalist for the Ernst & Young Entrepreneur of the Year Award for south central Ohio and Kentucky. AC Lens recently earned the fifth consecutive Biz Rate circle of excellence award for outstanding customer service.

== Merger with DiscountContacts.com ==
In April 2024, ACLens.com started redirecting to DiscountContacts.com, and users were met with a statement that ACLens.com is now a part of DiscountContacts.com. Both websites are owned by the same company, Arlington Lens Supply.
