= Browline glasses =

Style of eyeglass frames

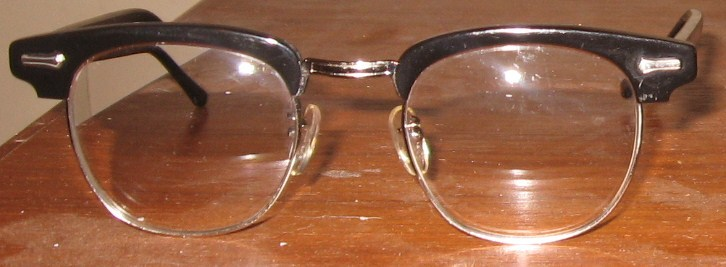
Browline glasses

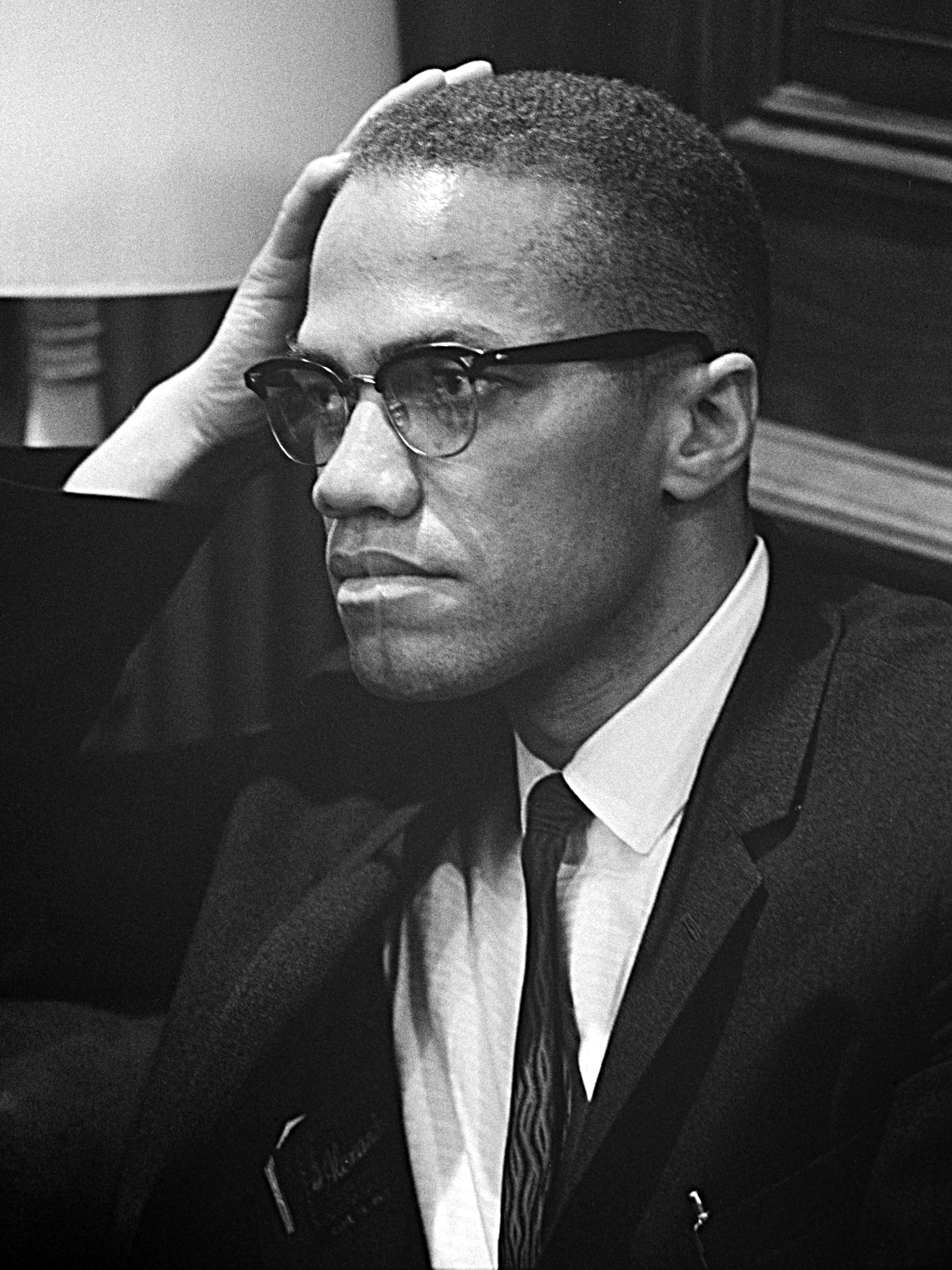
Malcolm X wearing browline glasses, of which he owned several pairs, each in different colours

Browline glasses are a style of eyeglass frames whose "bold" upper part holding the lenses resembles eyebrows framing the eyes. They were very popular during the 1950s and 1960s, especially in the US. The glasses were first manufactured by Shuron Ltd. in 1947 under the "Ronsir" brand and quickly emulated by various other manufacturers. The design was one of the most common style of eyeglasses throughout the 1950s and the early 1960s before it was surpassed in popularity by solid plastic styles. Browlines enjoyed a renaissance as sunglasses in the 1980s before returning to popularity in the 2010s, with the rise of retro style and the hipster subculture.

== Description ==
Browline glasses are constructed with the upper portion of the frame thicker than the lower, simulating eyebrows, or otherwise drawing attention to the wearer's natural brow line.

The most common means of construction is for the upper portion of the frame (the "brows" or "caps") and temples to be made of plastic, with the remainder of the frame (the bridge and eyewires, or "chassis") to be made of metal. The chassis inserts into the brows and is held in place by way of a series of screws. For a period in the 1960s, numerous models emerged in which the brows were constructed from aluminium; following the style's resurgence in the 2000s, browlines made wholly out of one type of metal with less pronounced brow portions became popular.

=== Monobrowlines ===
Monobrowlines are a variant of browlines in which the bridge is contiguous with the caps, creating a solid, unbroken line across the top of the frame. The style dates back to the Shuron Stag, a browline prototype, which enjoyed some brief popularity before being replaced by the Ronsir as Shuron's flagship frame. The original Stag had no metal chassis: the lenses were mounted directly to the brow caps via two sets of screws. Although the style was never popular in the United States, it became particularly fashionable in Europe and England in the 1960s as part of Amor's Spotlite line. The modern monobrowline originated in the 1980s, as part of an effort by Bausch and Lomb to diversify their Ray-Ban sunglass collection with the Wayfarer Max, a fusion of the then-popular Wayfarer and Clubmaster sunglass models. The style proved unpopular and was quickly phased out. The monobrowline design was resurrected by a variety of manufacturers in the 2010s (chiefly Oakley) after browlines returned to popularity. Unlike its tenure in the 1980s, monobrowlines proved to be a popular variant among eyeglass wearers in the 2010s.

== History ==
=== 1940s–1960s ===
Browline glasses were introduced in 1947 by Jack Rohrbach, then vice president of Shuron Ltd., an eyeglass company. The first browlines, sold under the "Ronsir" model name, had interchangeable bridges, eyewires, and "brows," allowing wearers to completely customize the size, fit, and color of their glasses. At the time, most frame manufacturers offered a limited number of colors and sizes. The Ronsir design was related to the earlier British Supra frame, developed by English optician Neville Chappell before the Second World War. Shuron later licensed the concept for the American market. The style became popular, and many other companies soon produced their own browline frames. Art-Craft Optical produced the "Art-Rim" brand, which offered designs for men ("Clubman") and women ("Leading Lady").

Throughout the 1960s, six manufacturers dominated the browline market: Shuron, Art-Craft Optical, Victory Optical, American Optical, and Bausch and Lomb (with the Ray-Ban Browline); each company differentiated their frames through unique plaques on the upper corners of the frames, which sometimes also served to cover the rivets attaching the temples to the frame.

The style continued to rise in popularity throughout the 1950s, with different manufacturers modifying the original browline design. Art-Craft and Victory Optical introduced browlines with much lighter aluminum caps instead of plastic brows. Shuron began modifying the original browline shape, beginning with the rectangular "Rondon" model, to appeal to individuals of all face shapes. For a period in the 1950s, plastic brows designed to emulate wood grains became popular, with Victory Optical offering models that allowed wearers to fit different caps to coordinate with different clothing. Ultimately, browline glasses accounted for half of all eyeglasses sold and worn in the 1950s. Many famous people from the mid-20th century are pictured wearing browlines, including black liberationist Malcolm X, Kentucky Fried Chicken founder Colonel Sanders, president Lyndon B. Johnson (most notably in his national statement regarding the signing of the 1964 Civil Rights Act), Vince Lombardi, Josemaría Escrivá, Josip Broz Tito (President of Yugoslavia) and others.

Browlines continued to remain popular through the 1960s, but less so as advances in plastics manufacturing offered even further frame customization via solid plastic eyeglasses, which could now be made in more shapes, sizes, and colors than in the past. Those who wished to wear plastic frames but still liked the browline style flocked to "plastic browlines," plastic glasses with transparent lower portions and solid upper portions, which became a major frame style of the 1960s.

=== 1970s–1990s ===
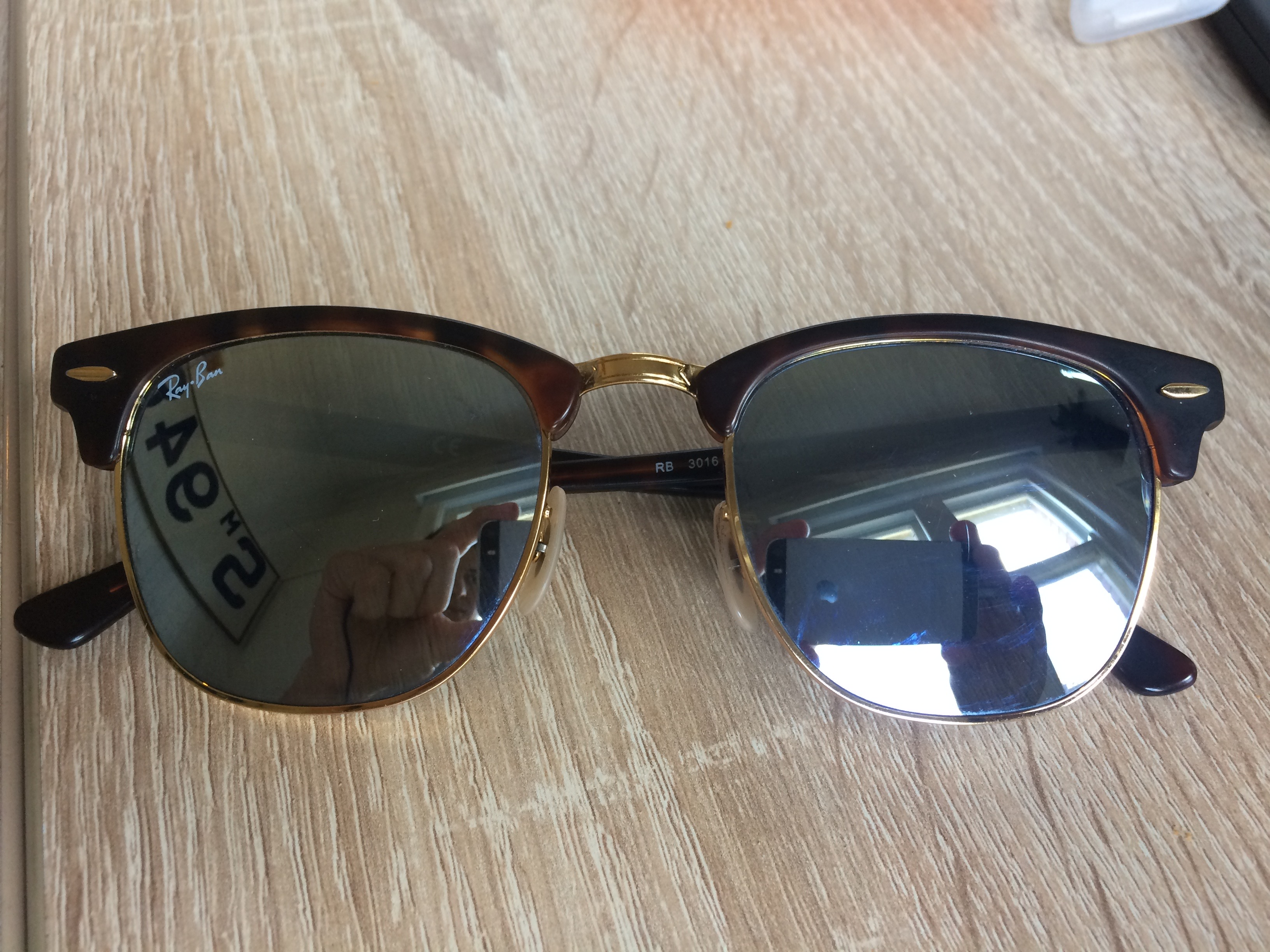
Ray-Ban 3016 Clubmaster sunglasses

In 1971 Shuron sold their sixteen-millionth pair of Ronsirs. However, the general backlash against the culture and fashion of the 1950s and 1960s which had begun with the hippie subculture led to a rapid decline in the popularity of browlines, which had come to carry undesirable conformist connotations. The style remained unpopular through the end of 1978, except among conservatives and the elderly. Demand suddenly rose between 1978 and 1980, as the anti-disco backlash affected the until-then popular Aviators and Teashades, which became associated with the fashion of the time. The rise also boosted the Wayfarer model, which like the Ronsirs were about to be phased out in the early 1980s. About 12,000 pairs were sold in 1982. Five years earlier fewer than 5,000 were purchased. However, by 1987 figures amounted for over 500,000.

In the mid-1980s Bruce Willis wore a pair of Shuron Ronsirs with tinted lenses on the series Moonlighting, leading to a surge in demand for browline sunglasses. In response, Ray-Ban, which already dominated the sunglasses market with their Wayfarers and Aviator sunglasses, introduced the Clubmaster, a traditional browline frame with sunglass lenses, and the Wayfarer Max, a Wayfarer shaped-and-sized browline. The Clubmaster went on to become the third best selling sunglasses style of the 1980s, behind the Wayfarer and Aviator. Bob Geldof can also be seen wearing a pair of browline sunglasses that look to be Clubmasters in the 1982 Pink Floyd movie The Wall.

Browlines (and plastic glasses in general) were deeply affected by the backlash against the 1980s consumer culture, and carried a variety of stigmas during the 1990s, variously identifying the wearer as a nerd, geek, elderly, or a devotee of far-right politics; the 1993 film Falling Down in particular helped to cement an association between browlines and the "angry white male".

=== 2000s onwards ===
During the 2000s browlines were still seen as overtly conformist or "nerdy" and were still associated with 1950s culture and fashion.

The influence of the television series Mad Men on the fashion world led to several eyeglass manufacturers offering browlines to meet demand for 1960s inspired frames. Major characters on several television series in the late 2000s and early 2010s were seen wearing browlines, including Mad Men, Heroes (on which the style worn by character Noah Bennet was erroneously identified as "horn rimmed glasses"), American Horror Story, and CSI: Crime Scene Investigation.

By 2013, of the major companies that produced browlines during the height of their popularity, only Shuron and Victory Optical still manufacture them. Shuron is the only company to have constantly produced browlines since their inception; Victory Optical shut down for a period in the 1980s–1990s before resuming manufacture in the 2000s. Art-Craft Optical still features the Clubman model on their webpage, although the company no longer manufactures the frame, and now only sells remaining parts from the factory. Ray-Ban still produces the Clubmaster.

== See also ==
- 2010s in fashion
- Cat eye glasses
- Horn-rimmed glasses
- Rimless eyeglasses
- Windsor glasses
