= Cat eye glasses =

Style of eyeglasses

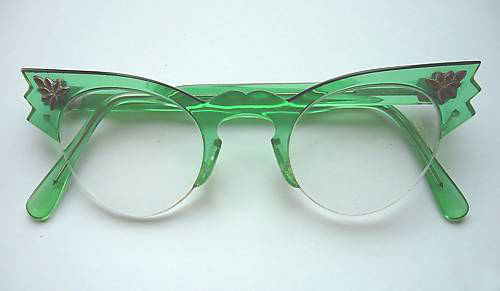
- Emerald Green women's cat eye glasses, c. 1958
- Type: Eyewear

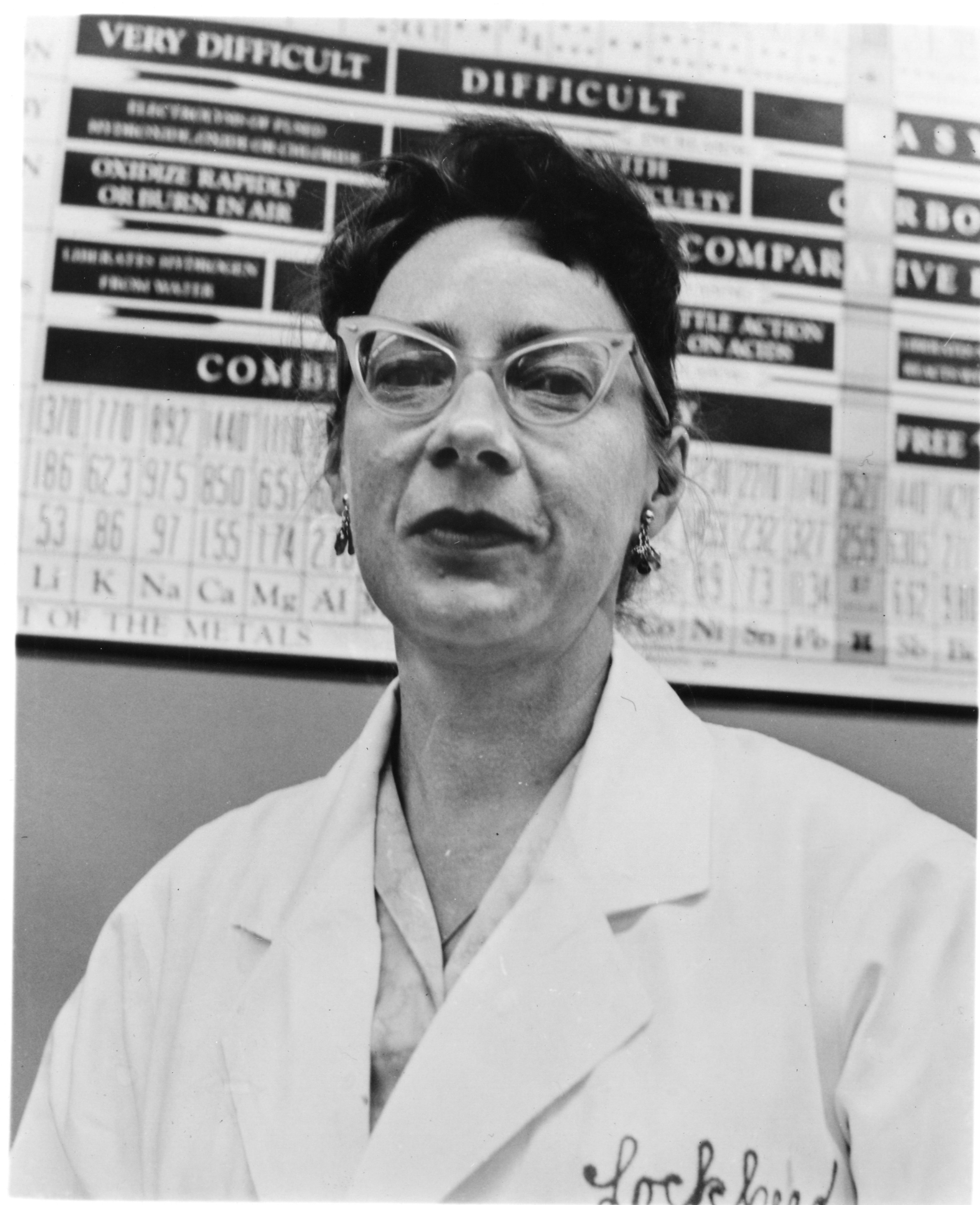
Woman wearing cat eye glasses in the 1960s

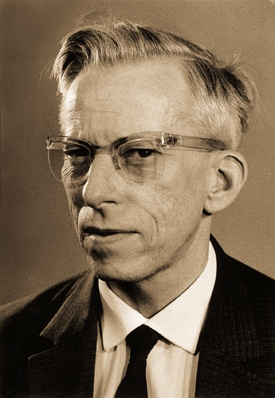
Dr. Otto Wichterle wearing a male version of cat eye glasses

Cat eye glasses (sometimes called "cat eyes" or "cat glasses") are a shape of eyewear. The form is closely related to the browline style, differentiated by having an upsweep at the outer edges where the temples or arms join the frame front. Cat-eye glasses were popular in the 1950s and 1960s among women and are often associated with the beehive hairstyle and other looks of the period. They preceded the large bug-eye glasses of the 1970s, 1980s, and 1990s.

== History ==
An early precursor of the cat-eye eyeglass shape was American Optical's Ful-Vue product, fr/om 1931, in which the hinges were placed on the upper portion of the eyeglass frame to reveal the wearer's eye from the sides. Window-dresser Altina Schinasi later designed what she called the Harlequin frame, named for the mask of the Harlequin character from Italian commedia dell'arte, then popular in fashion and design. Schinasi collaborated with popular boutique Lugene to manufacture them. One of the first pairs was bought by Vogue and Vanity Fair writer and socialite Clare Boothe Luce, raising the profile of the new style further. Fashion designer Claire McCardell and American Optical released their own version of the style in 1952, the first eyewear line by a fashion designer.

The style was popularized in the next two decades by celebrities and actresses such as Marilyn Monroe, Catherine Deneuve, and Audrey Hepburn. Other notable wearers of cat-eye eyeglasses include Barry Humphries as Dame Edna Everage, Jane Jacobs, Amy Lamé, Lisa Loeb, Dinah Manoff, Elizabeth Taylor, Shirley Chisholm, Mary Whitehouse, Allison Wolfe and Barbara Windsor.

The cat-eye shape fell out of fashion after the 1960s but was revived through 1990s fashion, and was popularized again in the late 2010s, in part by models and influencers such as Bella Hadid, Emily Ratajkowski, and Kendall Jenner.

By the mid-2020s, the style remained visible across the mainstream and fashion eyewear industry and was also incorporated into smartglasses. In 2024, Meta and Ray-Ban introduced the Skyler smartglasses frame, which has a cat-eye design.

== See also ==
- Horn-rimmed glasses
- Rimless eyeglasses
- Windsor glasses
