= America's Best Contacts & Eyeglasses =

American eyewear company

- Product type: Eyewear and Optometric Consumer Services
- Current owner: KKR
- Country: United States
- Introduced: 1978
- Related brands: Vision Center, Eyeglass World, The Optical Shoppe (inside Fred Meyer), Optical Center
- Previous owners: The original private investors from 1978 through 1990, followed from 1997 through 2005 by Consolidated Vision Group (aka Chrysallis Management), National Vision, Inc & Berkshire Partners

America's Best Contacts & Eyeglasses is a discount provider of eye examinations, eyeglasses and contact lenses, with over 1000 retail locations in the United States as of May 31, 2024.

== Overview ==
The millennial store is located in Philadelphia, PA, which happened to be one of National Vision's first markets in their early days over 40 years ago. From 2005 to 2014, America's Best was a division of National Vision, a privately held portfolio company owned by Berkshire Partners. In 2014, National Vision, Inc, was sold to KKR.

America's Best Contacts & Eyeglasses is the largest buyer of designer overstock eyeglass frames in the United States.

== History ==
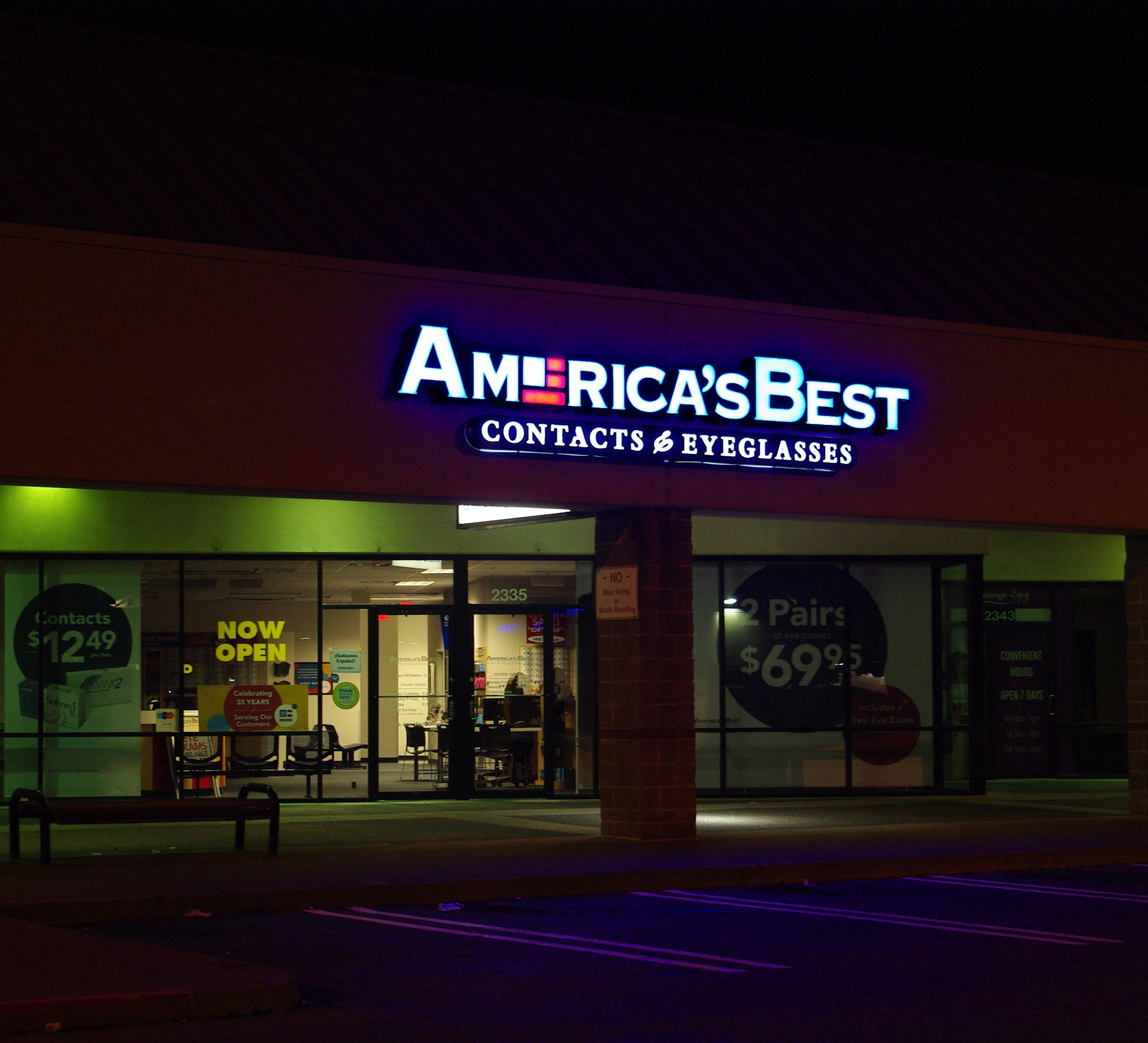
A retail outlet in Hillsboro, Oregon

America's Best Contacts & Eyeglasses and its predecessor entities were founded in July 1978 by Bill Grody, soon after federal deregulation permitted price advertising of eyewear, eye exams, and related services and supplies.

ABC&E's first location was on Chicago's Magnificent Mile in September 1978 on the 15th floor of a North Michigan Avenue office building, along with ABC&E's in-house advertising agency. From 1978 to early 1990, ABC&E remained internally financed. By 1990 the company had 34 locations including a full-service lens manufacturing facility. In April 1990, Grody sold the majority of the company in an LBO to Boston-based financial investors, Berkshire Partners, for $24 million, retaining minority ownership along with his senior management team. In December, 1993, Grody orchestrated a management-led leveraged buyout of ABC&E, repurchasing the majority of the company for $40 million, with Berkshire Partners choosing to maintain a minority position. In April 1997, Grody sold ABC&E in its entirety for $50 million to a strategic buyer, Chrysalis Management. Grody led the company throughout its growth until its final sale in 1997.

By 1997, ABC&E's revenues were $103 million and it had about 1,400 employees plus 150 independent doctors of optometry, 100 retail stores in 25 states, the District of Columbia, and Puerto Rico. Chrysalis Management, which owned eyewear stores located primarily in the Southwestern U.S., created Consolidated Vision Group ("CVG") in April 1997, a holding company established for its eyewear businesses including its purchase at that time of America's Best Contacts & Eyeglasses with America's Best Contacts & Eyeglasses as its largest and best known national brand. In 2003, America's Best Contacts & Eyeglasses had about $126 million in revenue from 105 locations. By 2004, it had $133 million from 111 locations.

== Acquisition ==
In September, 2005, Berkshire Partners again acquired America's Best Contacts & Eyeglasses along with the entire eyewear holdings of CVG, and simultaneously purchased another national eyewear company, National Vision, Inc. Upon its purchase, National Vision, Inc. became the parent company of all the eyewear businesses owned in the majority by Berkshire Partners with America's Best Contacts & Eyeglasses its largest division.

By the end of 2013, National Vision, Inc, had about 750 retail locations among with its America's Best Contacts & Eyeglasses brand accounting for about 425 locations. In the beginning of 2014, NVI was acquired in its entirety for more than $1 billion by KKR again with management participation and Berkshire Partners maintaining minority equity positions.
