= Windsor glasses =

Type of eyeglasses

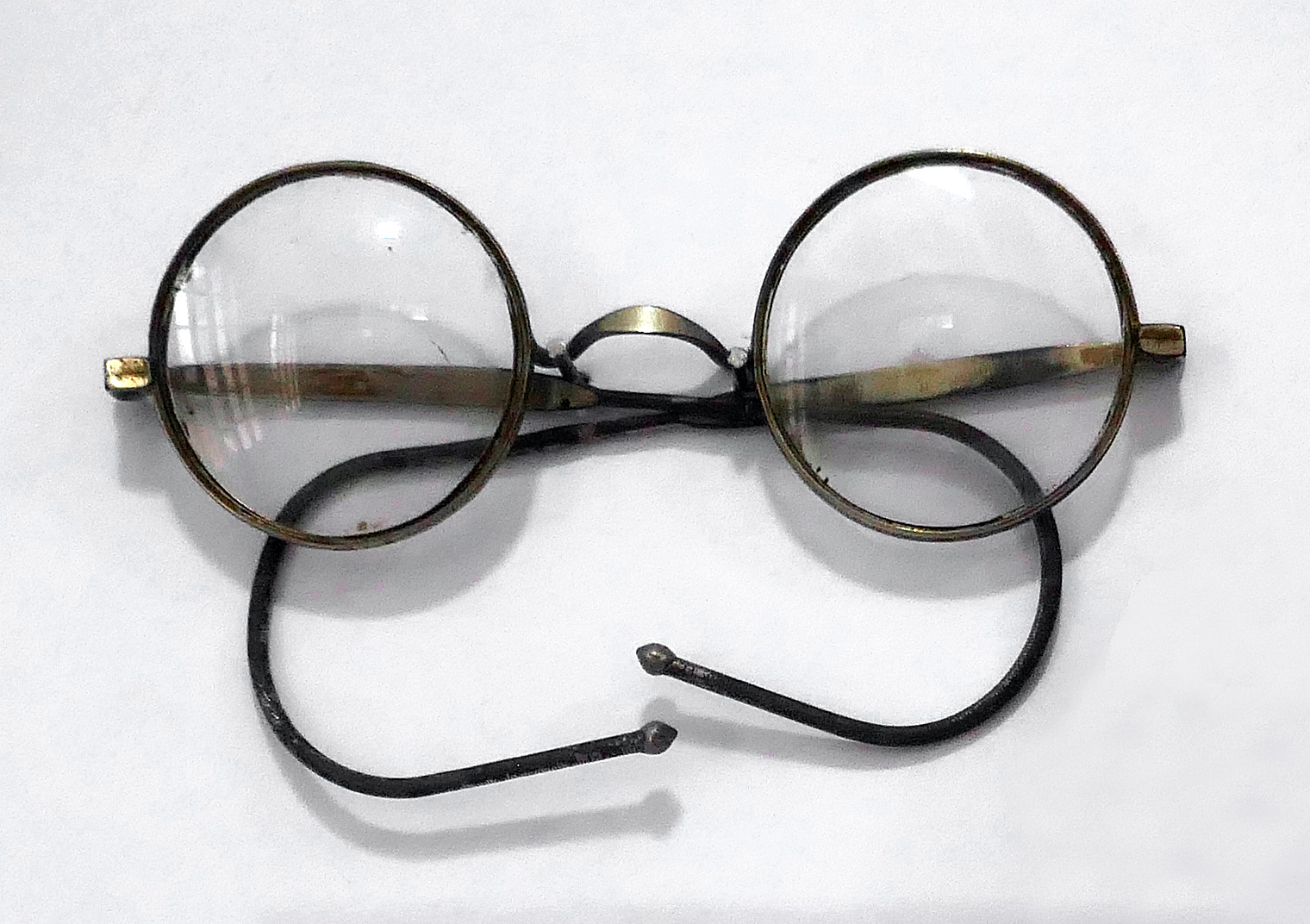
Mahatma Gandhi's glasses in the National Gandhi Museum

Windsor glasses (also known as Gandhi glasses, John Lennon glasses, sometimes round granny glasses; the tinted style is known as teashades) are a type of eyeglasses characterised by circular or nearly circular eyerims and a thin metal frame.

The Windsor style was produced in Britain by the 1840s. Traditional Windsor glasses have round frames, a saddle bridge over the nose, and temples extending from the midpoint of the frames.

== Notable wearers ==
Notable people associated with Windsor glasses include John Lennon, who first wore them on the set of How I Won the War in September 1966. A pair of Lennon's Windsor glasses was auctioned for $56,800 in 2020.

Other notable people who wore this style include Mahatma Gandhi. The National Gandhi Museum in New Delhi holds the spectacles that Gandhi last wore.

Theodore Roosevelt, Groucho Marx, and the fictional character Harry Potter also sometimes wore Windsor glasses, although they are better remembered for their rimless pince-nez, Groucho glasses, and horn-rimmed glasses, respectively.

Ozzy Osbourne wore blue-tinted teashade glasses as a tribute to John Lennon.

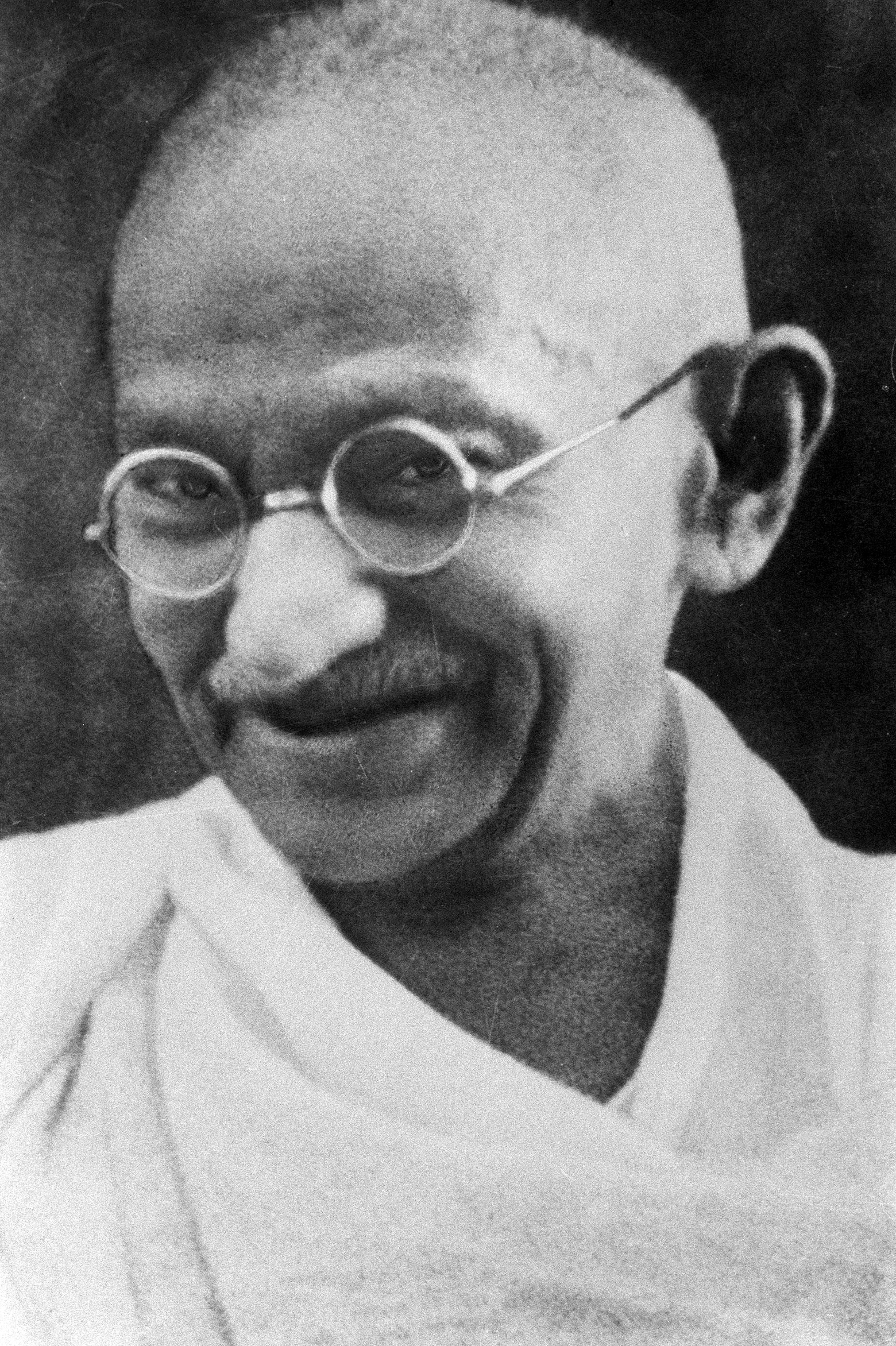
Mahatma Gandhi

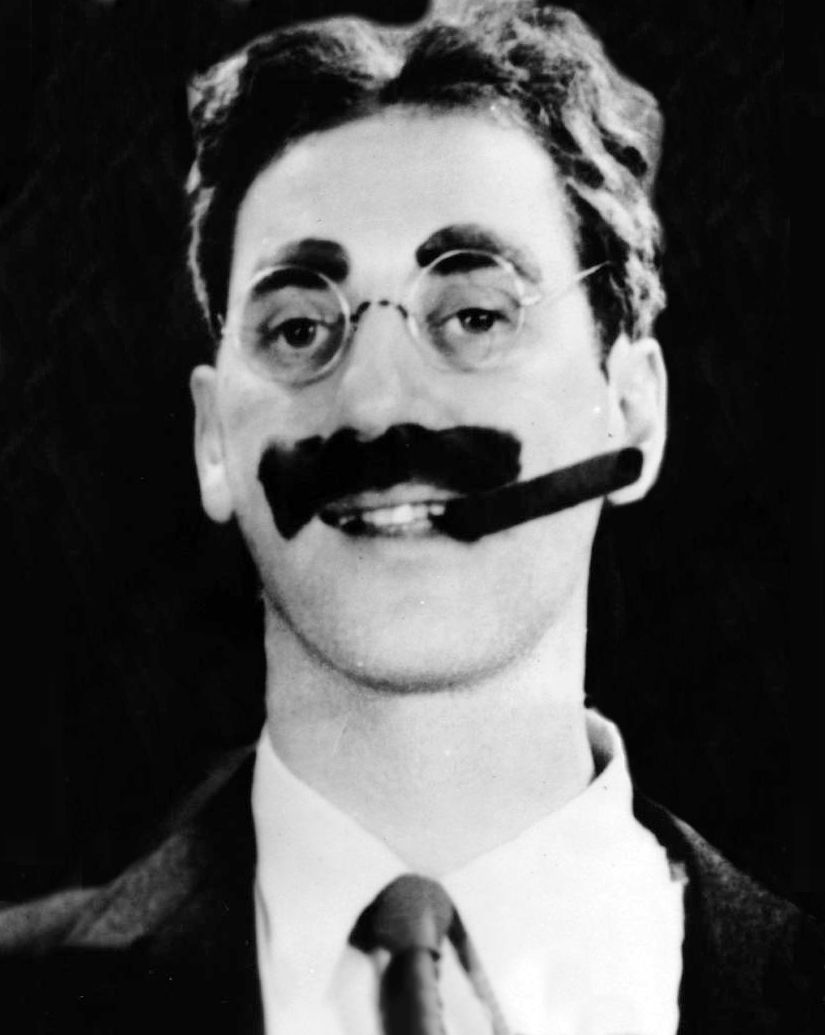
Groucho Marx

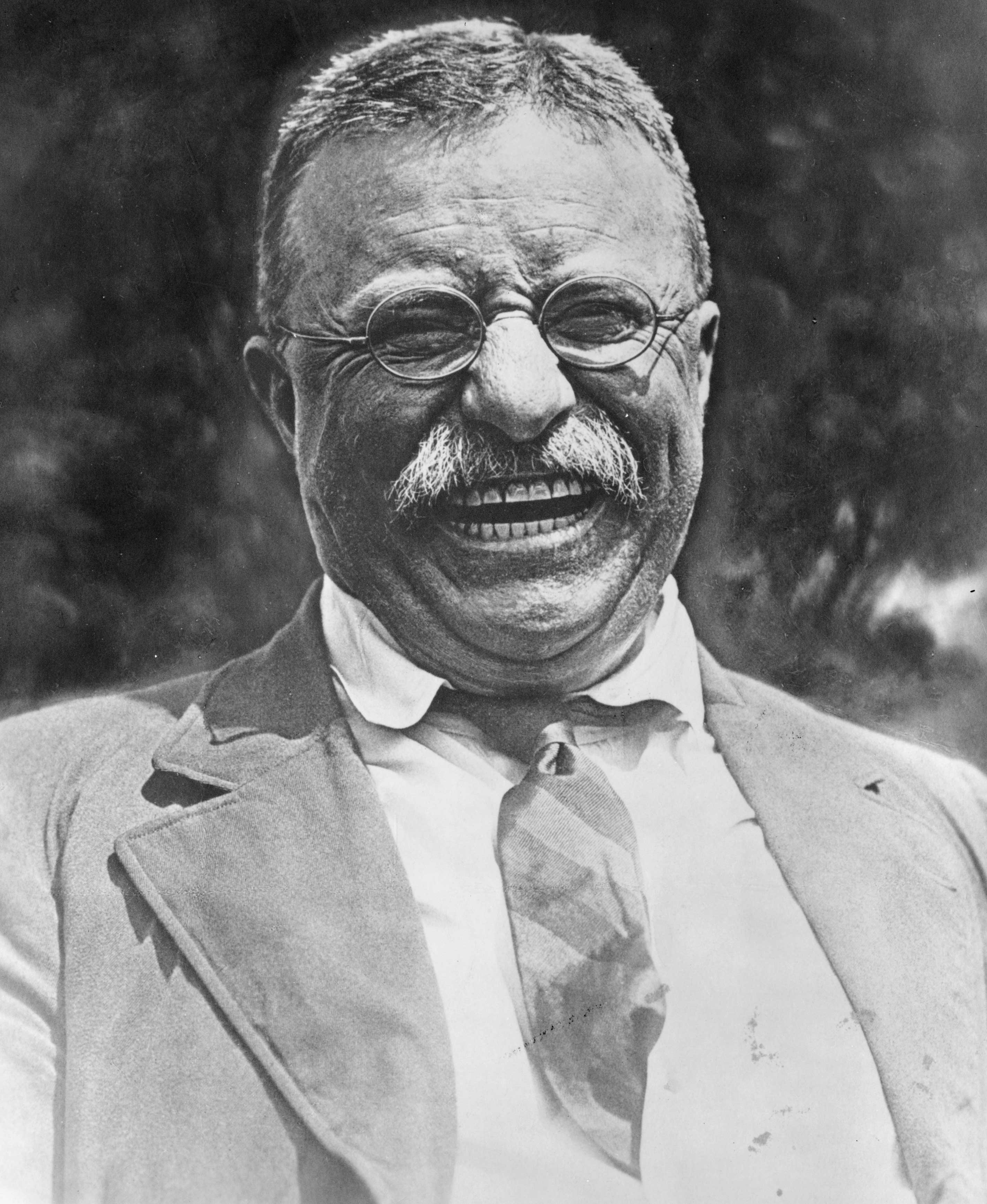
Theodore Roosevelt

== See also ==
- Browline glasses
- Bug-eye glasses
- Cat eye glasses
- Horn-rimmed glasses
- Rimless eyeglasses
