= Horn-rimmed glasses =

Type of eyeglasses

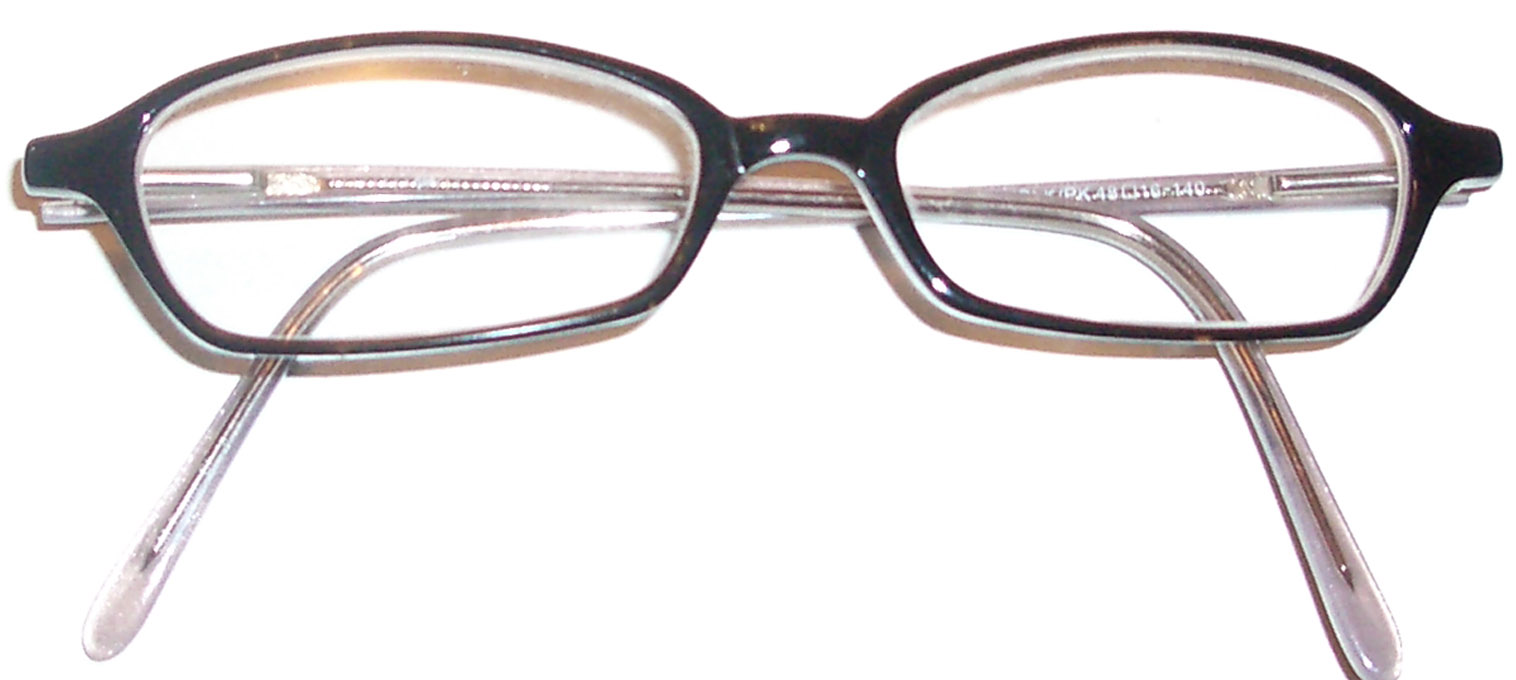
A pair of horn-rimmed glasses

Horn-rimmed glasses are a type of eyeglasses with frames traditionally made from horn or tortoiseshell. Since the twentieth century, most frames of this style have been made from plastics designed to imitate those materials. Horn-rimmed glasses are usually associated with thick, prominent rims, in contrast to thinner metal, wire or rimless eyeglass frames.

Horn-rimmed glasses were one of the first styles of eyeglasses to become a popular fashion item, after comedian Harold Lloyd began wearing a round pair in his films. The glasses have enjoyed various periods of popularity throughout the 20th century, being considered especially fashionable in the 1920s–1930s and in the 1950s–1960s in particular, while ceding to rimless and wire framed glasses during the 1970s and 1990s–2000s. Michael Caine's first appearance as Harry Palmer in The Ipcress File in 1965 featured his signature look of thick horn-rimmed glasses which made him a style icon of the 1960s. The style has brought a resurgence of popularity in the late 20th (1980s–1990s) and early 21st (2010s) centuries, with an emphasis on retro fashions. This may be due in part from the influence of hipster subculture, and the television series Mad Men, which repopularized 1960s fashions in general.

== History ==
Horn-rimmed glasses were initially popularized by comedian Harold Lloyd after he wore them in his 1917 comedy short Over the Fence. Lloyd had risen to fame playing an eccentric named Lonesome Luke, characterized by an ostentatious appearance. In an effort to break away from the character and revitalize his career, Lloyd crafted a new character who would be Luke's opposite and made distinct by a nondescript appearance. Lloyd outfitted himself in clothing popular among Americans in the 1910s, completing the ensemble with a pair of round, horn-rimmed glasses that would solidify the character's status as "ordinary." Glasses wearing had long been stigmatized, with wearers stereotyped as physically weak intellectuals, members of the clergy, or simply elderly; President Theodore Roosevelt's wearing of rimless eyeglasses had only recently begun to eliminate the stigma, albeit with glasses designed to minimize their appearance. Lloyd chose horn-rimmed frames partly because they had become a youth fashion at the time, which suited the energetic character he wanted to create.

Lloyd named the character "The Glasses Character" or "The Glass Character" after the frames; the lenses themselves had in fact been removed, both because Lloyd did not require glasses to see, and because studio lights reflecting off of the lenses obscured Lloyd's eyes on film. The character proved successful with audiences and resulted in an unexpected rise in popularity of horn-rimmed glasses: sales around the world rose as the popular Lloyd's appearance wearing glasses helped to dispel negative stereotypes of glasses wearers. When Lloyd ultimately broke the frames and attempted to order a new pair from the manufacturer, his check was returned along with an order of twenty frames and a note from the company thanking him for his endorsement. Explaining his reasons for the glasses, as well as their sartorial advantages, Lloyd said: "They make low-comedy clothes unnecessary, permit enough romantic appeal to catch the feminine eye, usually diverted from comedies, and they hold me down to no particular type or range of story."

Horn-rimmed glasses were popular in the 1920s but steadily lost their appeal as sturdier metal styles became more economic alternatives during the Depression. Exposure to heat and sunlight rendered the plastic brittle and prone to breakage, often to the point that they would break should an optician attempt to install new lenses.

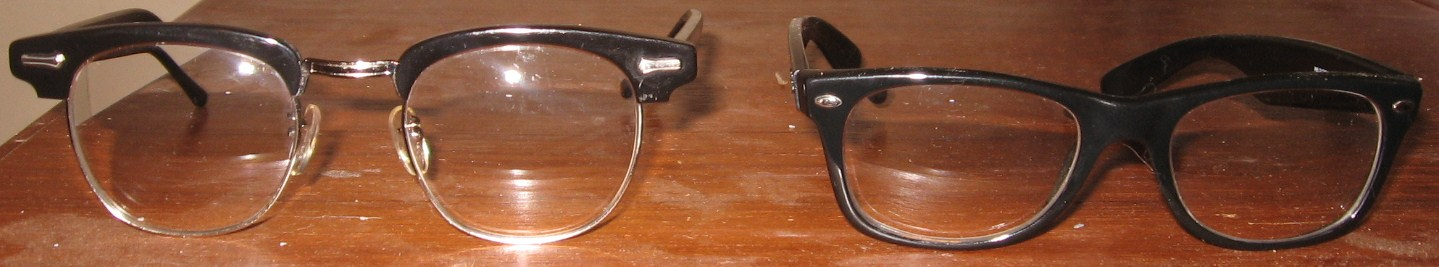
Comparison of browline (left) and Wayfarer horn-rimmed glasses, with prescription lenses for myopia

A variant of horn-rimmed glasses, browline glasses, became one of the defining eyeglass styles of the 1940s and 1950s. Invented in 1947, the style combined the aesthetics of horn-rimmed glasses with the stability of metal frames by fitting prominent plastic "brows" over the tops of metal frames, creating a distinctive look that was also sturdier than solid plastic frames. Browlines quickly became popular in post-World War II America, and composed half of all eyeglass sales throughout the 1950s. Ray-Ban introduced the Wayfarer sunglasses in 1952.

Plastic eyeglass frames became increasingly common throughout the 1950s and into the 1960s, as plastic allowed frames to be made in a wider range of styles and colors than earlier materials.. Tortoiseshell and horn-rimmed glasses had become popular in the 1920s and 1930s, but many such frames were made from celluloid, an early plastic that could be molded and dyed to resemble horn or tortoiseshell.

Buddy Holly iconisized the horn-rimmed style, with his upbeat pop culture rock and roll music. The trend died out in the 1970s with a backlash against 50s and 60s culture, as oversized metal glasses in the style of the Ray-Ban Aviator became popular. Semi-round horn-rimmed glasses came back into fashion in the 1980s, with tortoiseshell being fashionable amongst entrepreneurs and "yuppies". Wayfarers were popular among New Wave musicians, which popularized them among the late 1970s anti-disco "resistance".

Horn-rimmed glasses fell back out of fashion in the 1990s but returned to popularity with the rise of the emo and hipster subcultures in the early 2000s. Many glasses manufactured during this period tended to imitate popular metal eyeglass styles, with significantly thinner frames and vertically smaller lenses. The popularization of 1960s styles by the television show Mad Men led to horn-rimmed frames produced in the 2010s being more traditional, with large lenses and thick, heavy frames.

== See also ==
- Browline glasses
- Cat eye glasses
- Rimless eyeglasses
- Windsor glasses
