= Glasses =

Form of vision aid

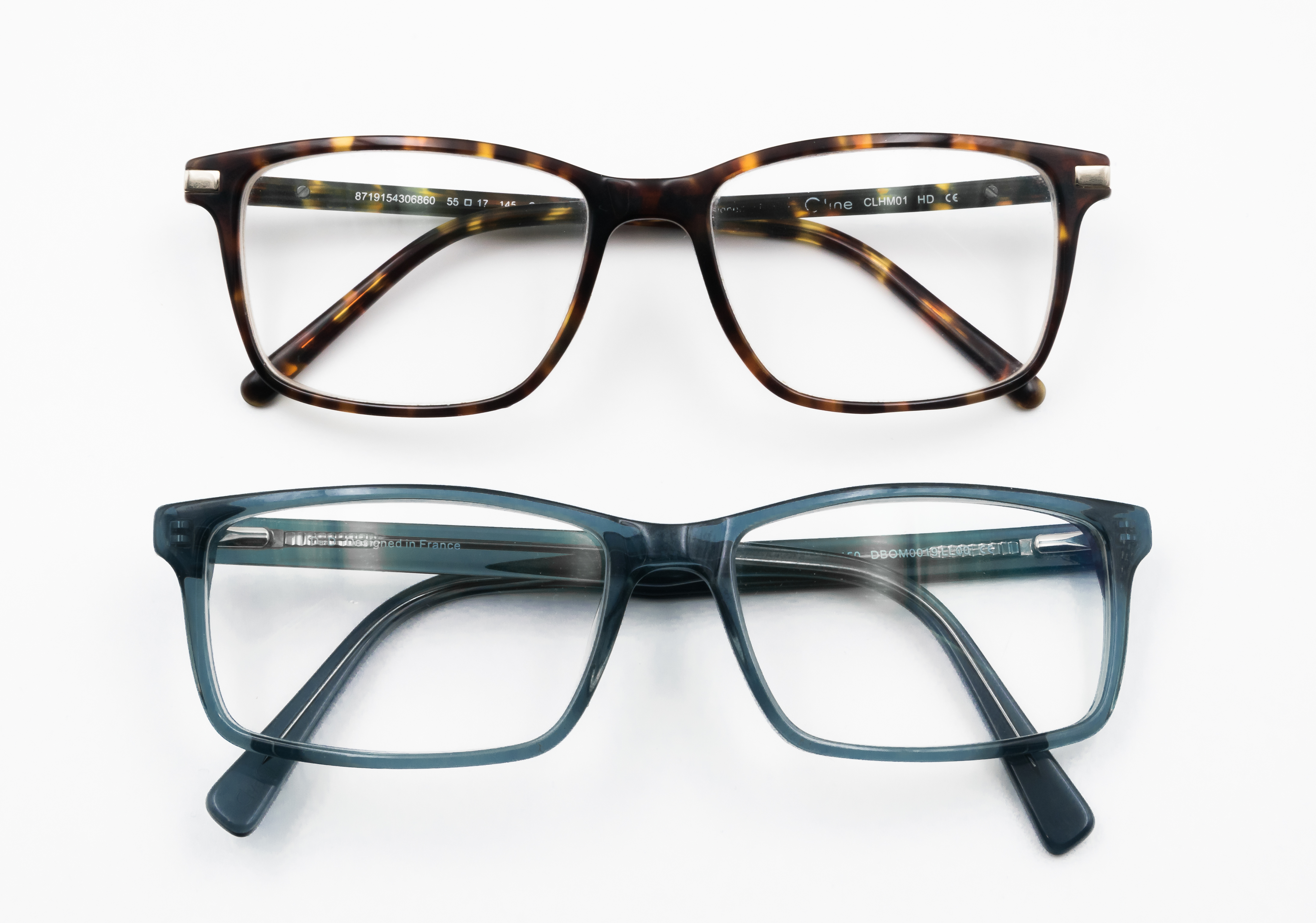
- Two pairs of modern glasses
- Other names: Eyeglasses, spectacles
- Specialty: Ophthalmology, optometry

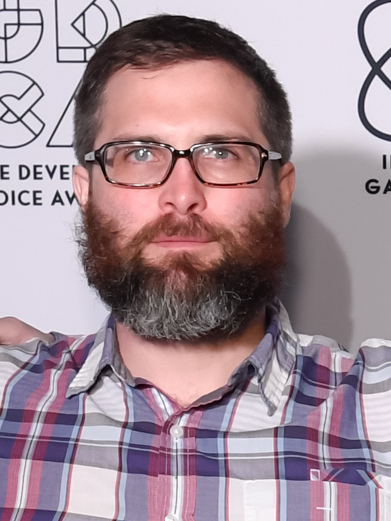
A man with glasses

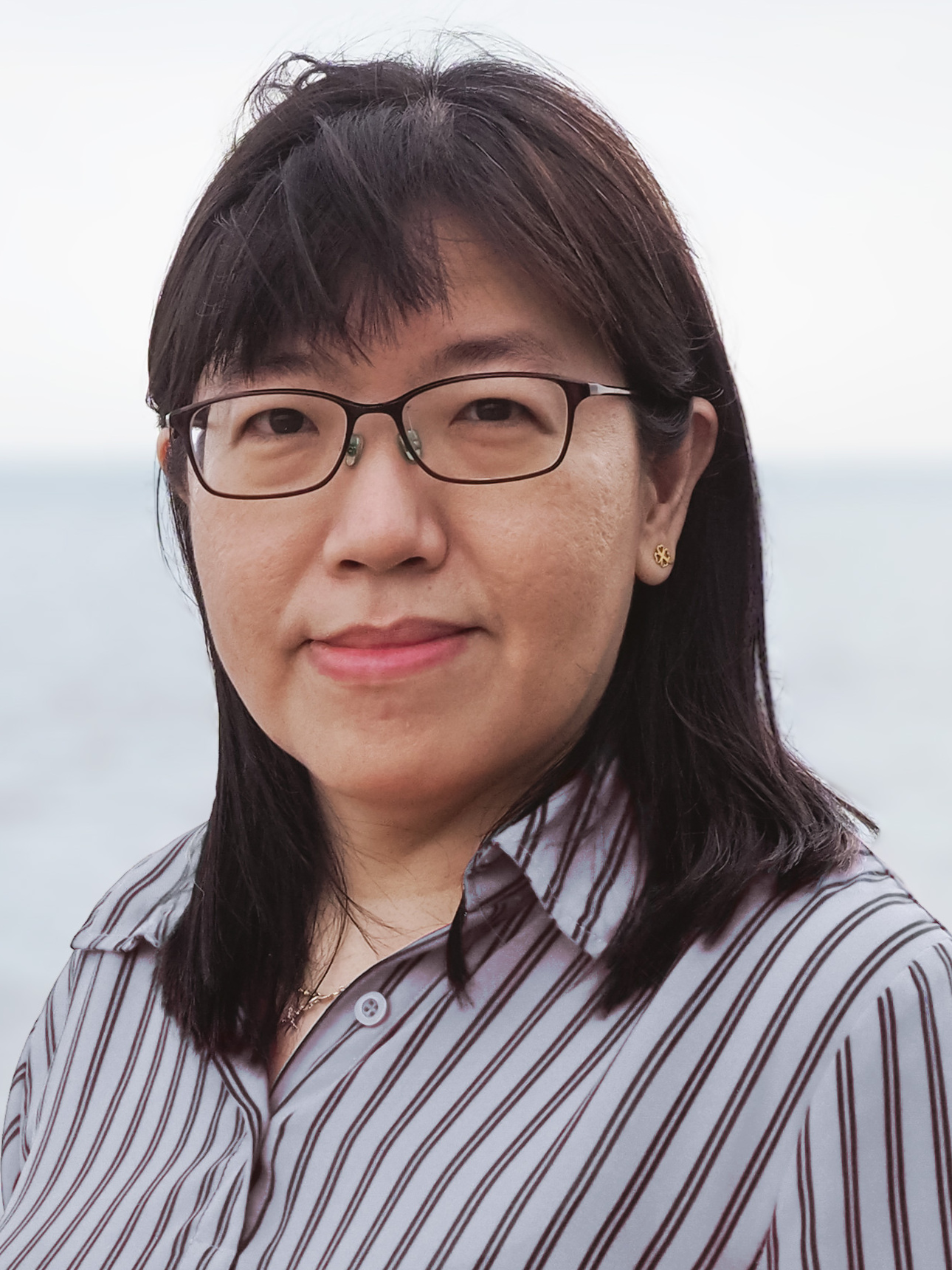
A woman with glasses

Glasses, also known as eyeglasses, spectacles, or colloquially as specs, are vision eyewear with clear or tinted lenses mounted in a frame that holds them in front of a person's eyes. They may be used for medical, safety and fashion purposes.

Prescription glasses are used for vision correction, such as with reading glasses and glasses used for nearsightedness.

Sunglasses allow for better vision in bright daylight and are used to protect one's eyes against damage from excessive levels of light. Typical sunglasses lenses are tinted for protection against bright light or polarized to remove glare. Photochromic glasses are clear or lightly tinted in dark or indoor conditions, but turn into sunglasses when they come into contact with ultraviolet light. People with conditions that have photophobia as a primary symptom (like certain migraine disorders) often wear sunglasses or precision tinted glasses, even indoors and at night.

Safety glasses are a form of personal protective equipment that are worn by workers around their eyes for protection. Safety glasses act as a shield to protect the eyes from any type of foreign debris that may cause irritation or injury; these glasses may have protection on the sides of the eyes as well as in the lenses. Glasses are worn for eye protection in some sports, such as squash and skiing. Some types of safety glasses are used to protect against visible and near-visible light (including ultraviolet light) or radiation.

Specialized glasses may be used for viewing specific visual information, for example, 3D glasses for 3D films (stereoscopy).

Glasses are also worn purely for fashion or aesthetic purposes. Even with glasses used for vision correction, a wide range of fashions are available, using plastic, metal, wire, and other materials for frames. Most glasses lenses are made of plastic, polyethylene, and glass.

The earliest ancestors of modern glasses were 13th-century Italian "reading stones". Due to the objects having no arms, wearers had to hold these magnifying spheres directly over their books. The familiar temple arms that hook over a wearer's ears were not invented until the 1700s. Modern glasses also have a bridge over the nose for support.

== Types ==
Glasses can be classified by their primary function. They may also appear in combinations, such as prescription sunglasses, or safety glasses with enhanced magnification.

=== Corrective ===
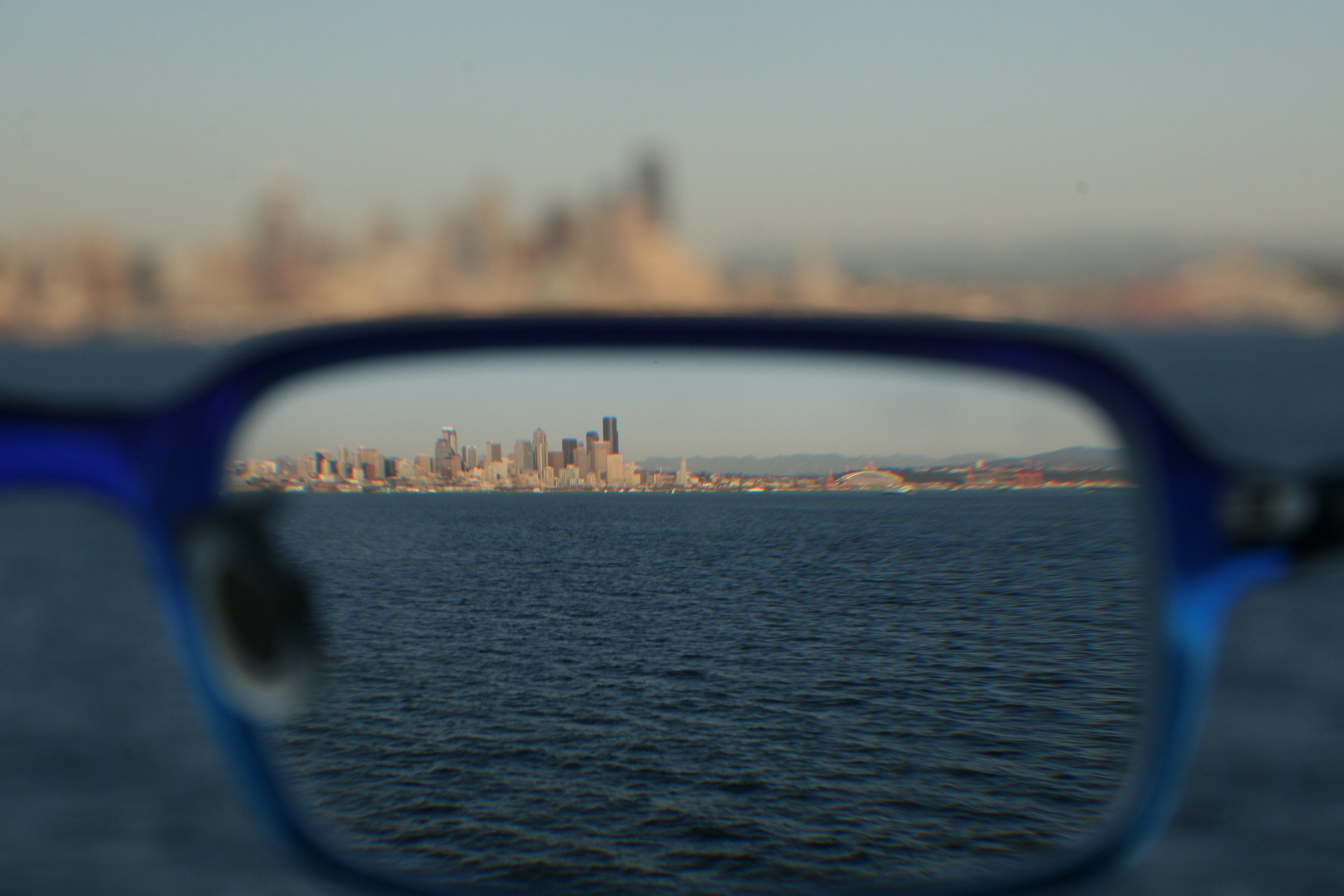
A skyline seen through a corrective lens, showing the effect of refraction

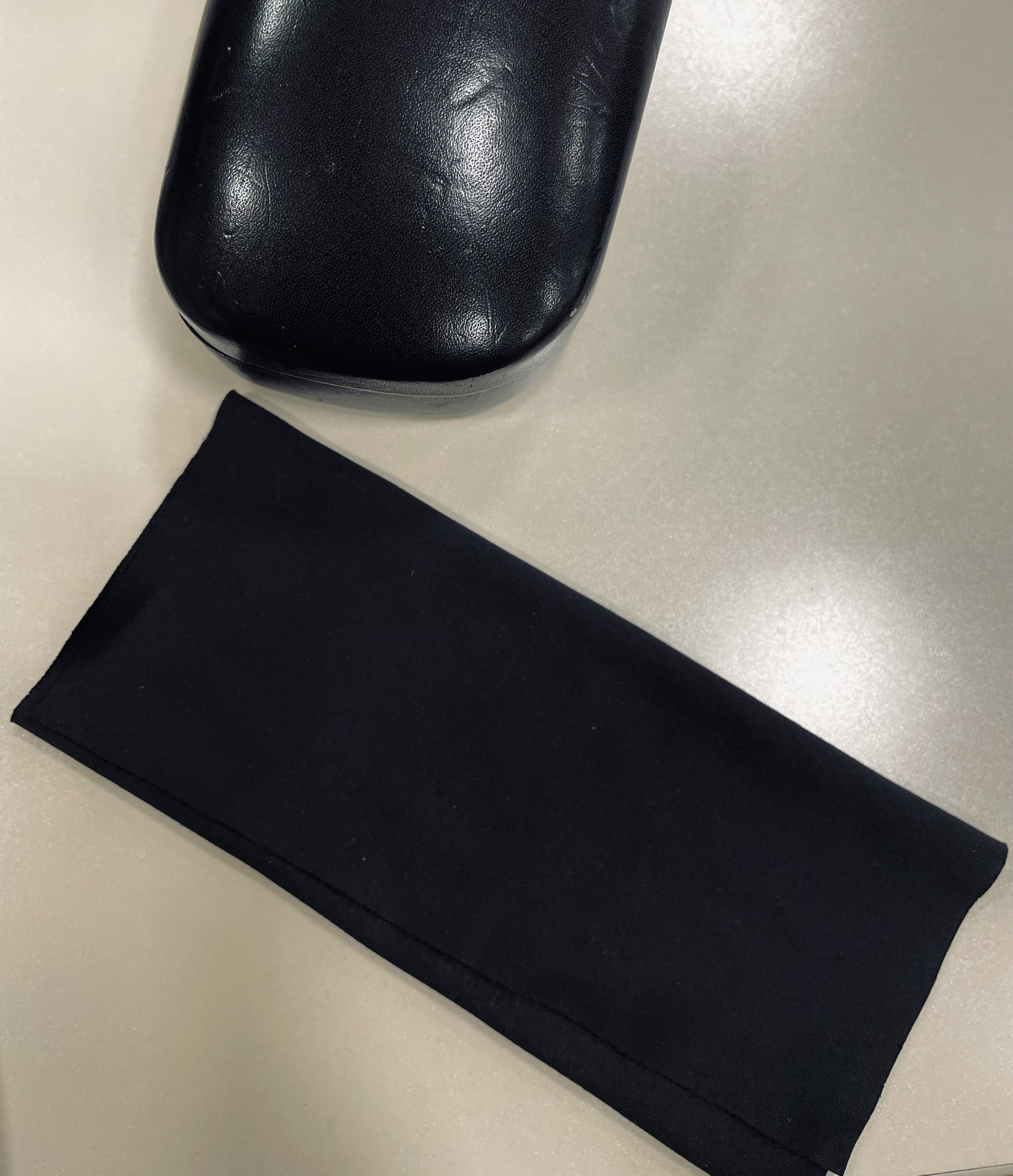
Microfiber cloth designed for cleaning corrective lenses without scratching sensitive glass

Corrective lenses are used to correct refractive errors by bending the light entering the eye in order to alleviate the effects of conditions such as nearsightedness (myopia), farsightedness (hypermetropia) or astigmatism.

The ability of one's eyes to accommodate their focus to near and distant focus alters over time. A common condition in people over forty years old is presbyopia, which is caused by the eye's crystalline lens losing elasticity, progressively reducing the ability of the lens to accommodate (i.e. to focus on objects close to the eye). Few people have a pair of eyes that show exactly equal refractive characteristics; one eye may need a "stronger" (i.e. more refracting) lens than the other.

Corrective lenses bring the image back into focus on the retina. They are made to conform to the prescription of an ophthalmologist or optometrist. A lensmeter can be used to verify the specifications of an existing pair of glasses.

Corrective glasses can significantly improve the life quality of the wearer. Not only do they enhance the wearer's visual experience, but can also reduce problems that result from eye strain, such as headaches or squinting.

The most common type of corrective lens is "single vision", which has a uniform refractive index. For people with presbyopia and hyperopia, bifocal and trifocal glasses provide two or three different refractive indices, respectively, and progressive lenses have a continuous gradient. For children, near-sighted (myopia) control lenses involve use of special lenses that assist to slow down the progression of myopia from growing further. Lenses can also be manufactured with high refractive indices, which allow them to be more lightweight, flatter and thinner than their counterparts with "low" refractive indices. High-Refractive Index lenses are aesthetically more appealing too.

Reading glasses provide a separate set of glasses for focusing on close by objects. They are available without prescription from drugstores, and offer a cheap, practical solution, though these have a pair of simple lenses of equal power, and so will not correct refraction problems like astigmatism or refractive or prismatic variations between the left and right eye. For the total correction of the individual's sight, glasses complying to a recent ophthalmic prescription are required.

People who need glasses to see often have corrective lens restrictions on their driver's licenses that require them to wear their glasses every time they drive or risk fines or jail time.

Some militaries issue prescription glasses to servicemen and women. These are typically GI glasses. Many state prisons in the United States issue glasses to inmates, often in the form of clear plastic aviators.

Adjustable-focus glasses might be used to replace bifocals or trifocals, or might be used to produce cheaper single-vision glasses (since they do not have to be custom-manufactured for every person).

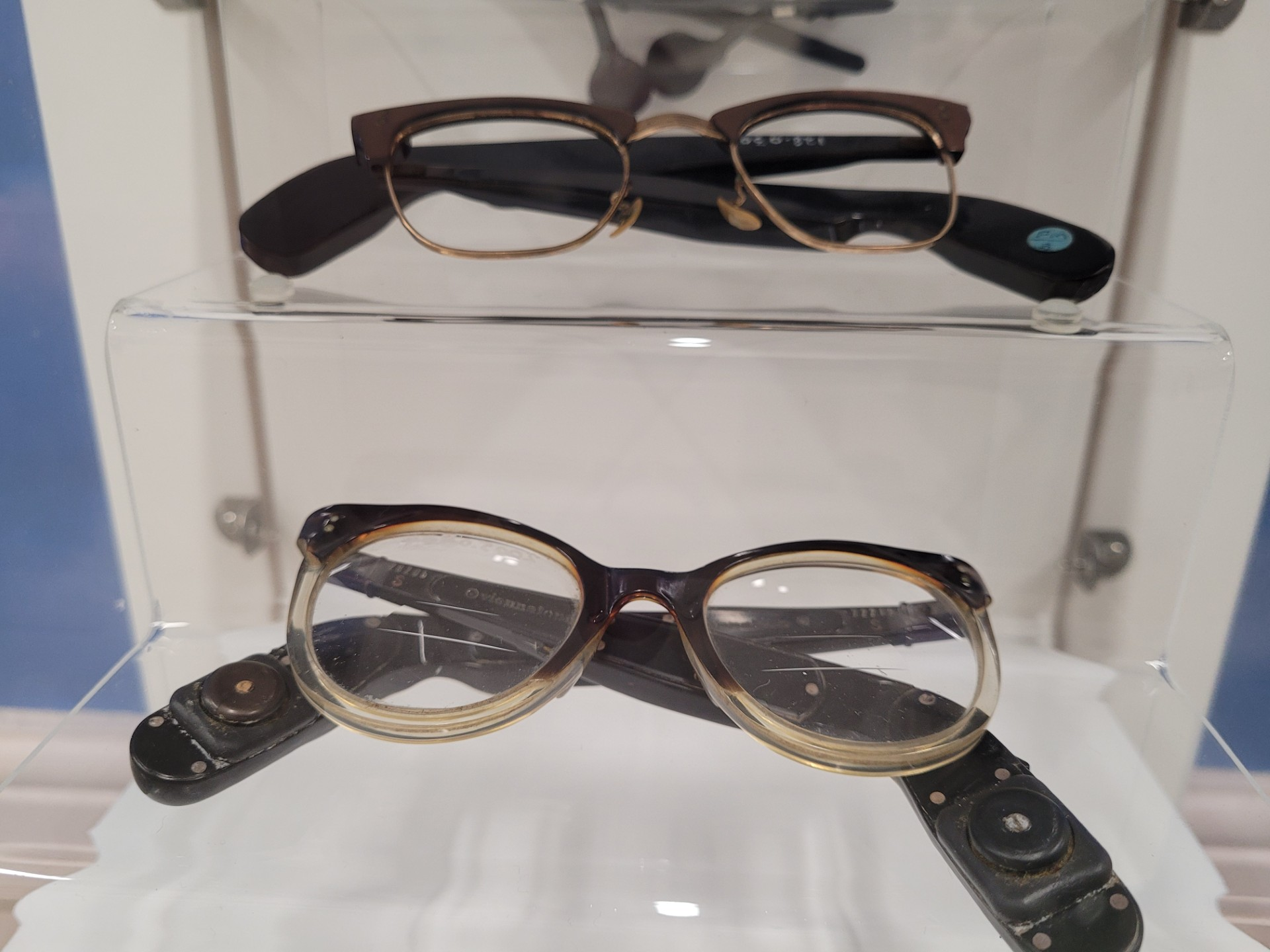
1940s combined hearing aid glasses, on display at Thackray Museum of Medicine.

Pinhole glasses are a type of corrective glasses that do not use a lens. Pinhole glasses do not actually refract the light or change focal length. Instead, they create a diffraction limited system, which has an increased depth of field, similar to using a small aperture in photography. This form of correction has many limitations that prevent it from gaining popularity in everyday use. Pinhole glasses can be made in a DIY fashion by making small holes in a piece of card which is then held in front of the eyes with a strap or cardboard arms.

Glasses may also house other corrective or assistive devices. After the development of the transistor in the 1940s, combined eyeglass-hearing aids became popular. With thick-rimmed glasses the fashion at the time, a hearing aid could be concealed in the temple part of the frame. These fell out of fashion after the 1970s, but there are still occasions when combined eyeglass-hearing aids may be useful.

=== Safety ===
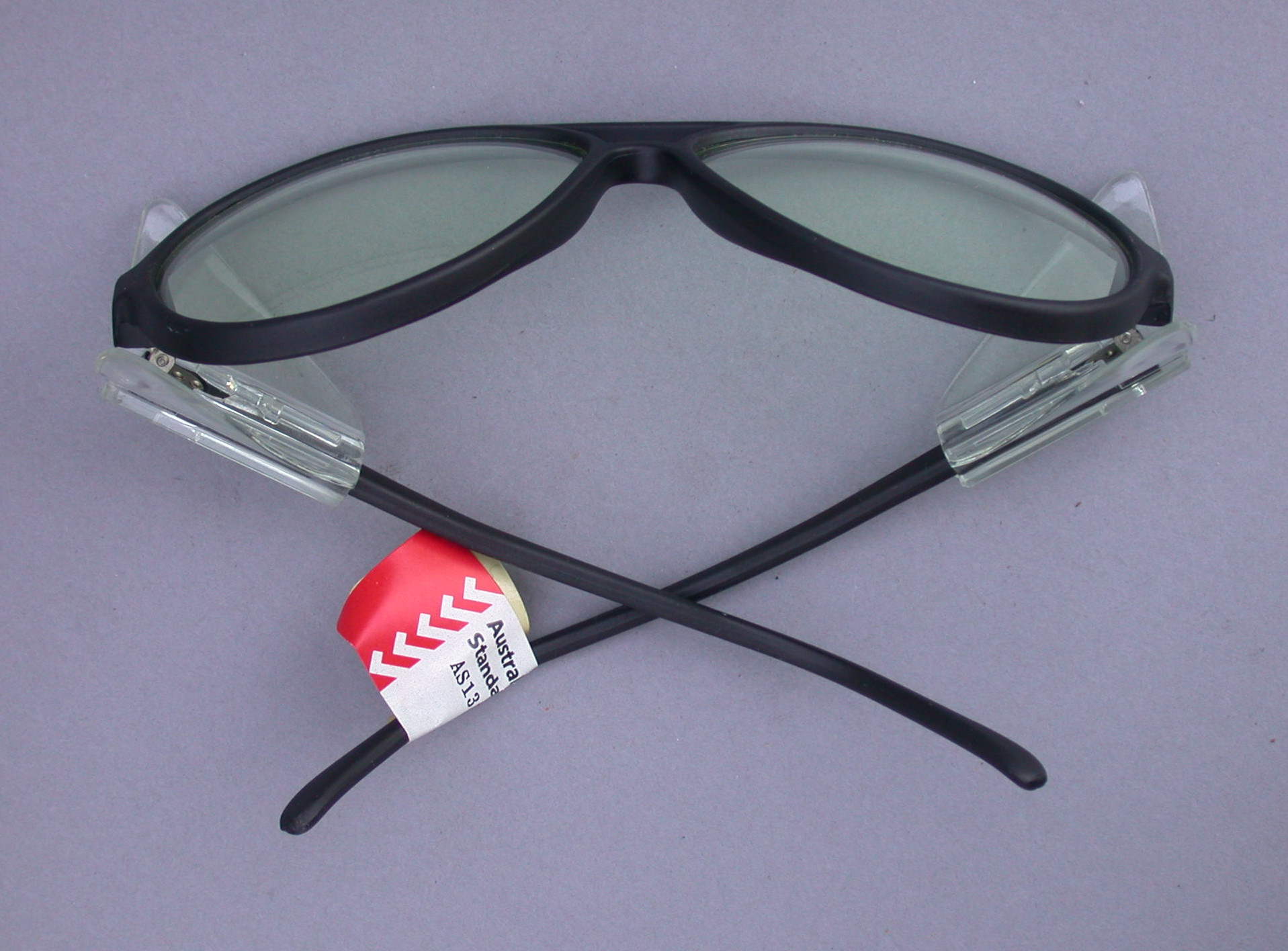
Safety glasses with side shields

Safety glasses are worn to protect the eyes in various situations. They are made with break-proof plastic lenses to protect the eye from flying debris or other matter. Construction workers, factory workers, machinists and lab technicians are often required to wear safety glasses to shield the eyes from flying debris or hazardous splatters such as blood or chemicals. As of 2017, dentists and surgeons in Canada and other countries are required to wear safety glasses to protect against infection from patients' blood or other body fluids. There are also safety glasses for welding, which are styled like wraparound sunglasses, but with much darker lenses, for use in welding where a full-sized welding helmet is inconvenient or uncomfortable. These are often called "flash goggles" because they provide protection from welding flash. Nylon frames are usually used for protective eyewear for sports because of their lightweight and flexible properties. Unlike most regular glasses, safety glasses often include protection beside the eyes as well as in front of the eyes. Alternatively, safety glasses can be wraparound in design.

=== Sunglasses ===
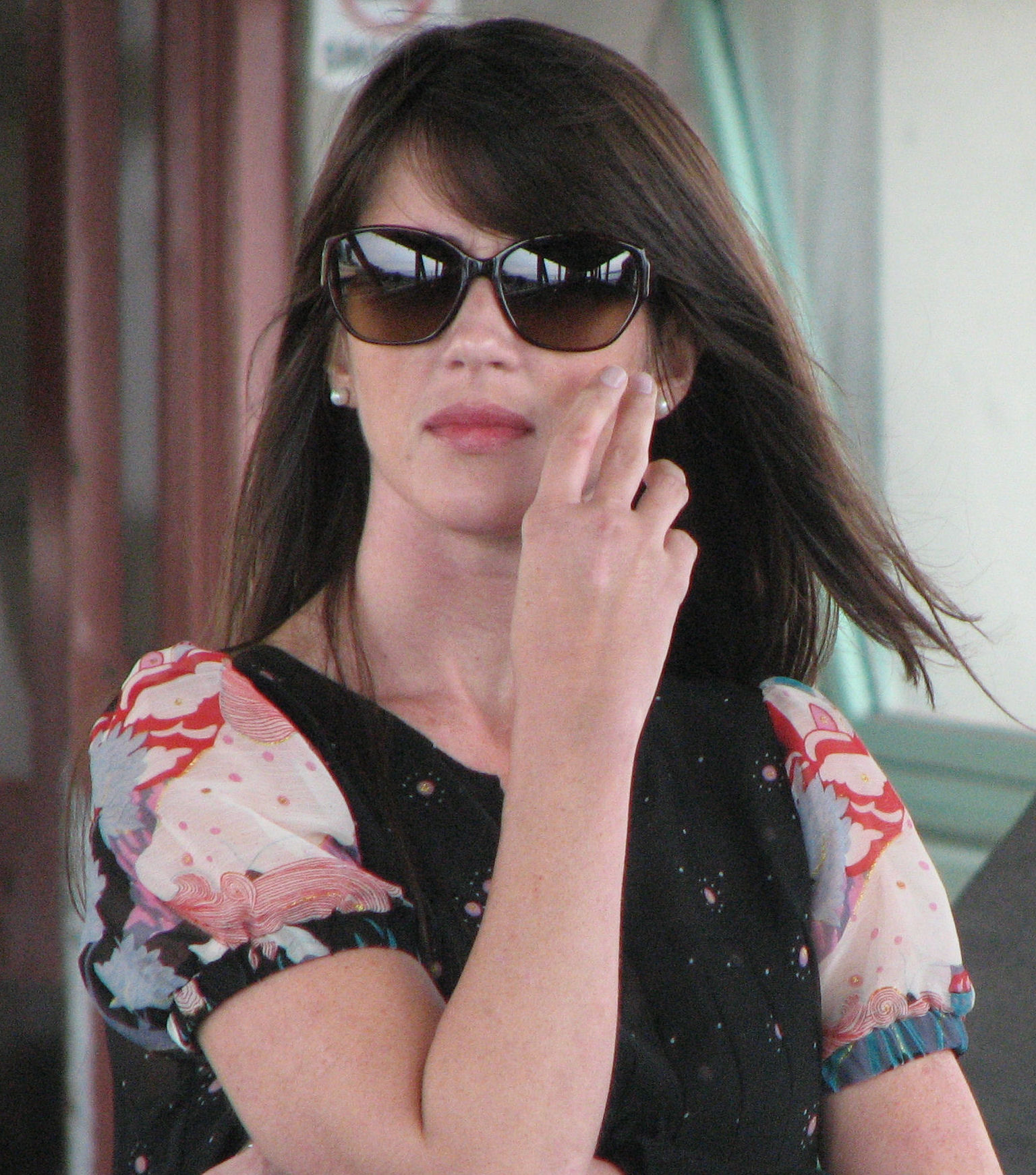
Woman wearing sunglasses

Sunglasses provide more comfort and protection against bright light and often against ultraviolet (UV) light. To properly protect the eyes from the dangers of UV light, sunglasses should have UV-400 blocker to provide good coverage against the entire light spectrum that poses a danger.

Light polarization is an added feature that can be applied to sunglass lenses. Polarization filters are positioned to remove horizontally polarized rays of light, which eliminates glare from horizontal surfaces (allowing wearers to see into water when reflected light would otherwise overwhelm the scene). Polarized sunglasses may present some difficulties for pilots since reflections from water and other structures often used to gauge altitude may be removed. Liquid-crystal displays emit polarized light, making them sometimes difficult to view with polarized sunglasses. Sunglasses may be worn for aesthetic purposes, or simply to hide the eyes. Examples of sunglasses that were popular for these reasons include tea shades and mirrored lenses. Many blind people wear nearly opaque glasses to hide their eyes for cosmetic reasons. Many people with light sensitivity conditions wear sunglasses or other tinted glasses to make the light more tolerable.

Sunglasses may also have corrective lenses, which requires a prescription. Clip-on sunglasses or sunglass clips can be attached to another pair of glasses. Some wrap-around sunglasses are large enough to be worn over another pair of glasses. Otherwise, many people opt to wear contact lenses to correct their vision so that standard sunglasses can be used.

=== Mixed double-frame (Flip glasses) ===
Double-frame eyewear with one set of lenses on the moving frame and another pair of lenses on a fixed frame (optional).

The double frame uplifting glasses have one moving frame with one pair of lenses and the basic fixed frame with another pair of lenses (optional), that are connected by four-bar linkage. For example, sun lenses could be easily lifted up and down while mixed with myopia lenses that always stay on. Presbyopia lenses could be also combined and easily removed from the field of view if needed without taking off glasses. These glasses are often used for drivers going through tunnels, with the upper frame serving as sunglasses and the second frame as transparent lenses.

=== 3D glasses ===
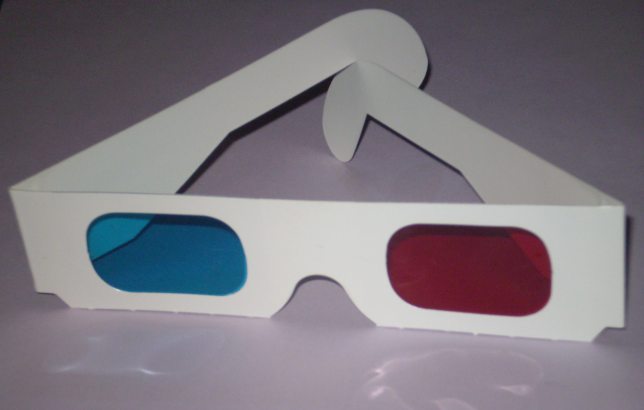
3d glasses

The illusion of three dimensions on a two-dimensional surface can be created by providing each eye with different visual information. 3D glasses create the illusion of three dimensions by filtering a signal containing information for both eyes. The signal, often light reflected off a movie screen or emitted from an electronic display, is filtered so that each eye receives a slightly different image. The filters only work for the type of signal they were designed for.

Anaglyph 3D glasses have a different colored filter for each eye, typically red and blue or red and green. A polarized 3D system on the other hand uses polarized filters. Polarized 3D glasses allow for color 3D, while the red-blue lenses produce an image with distorted coloration. An active shutter 3D system uses electronic shutters. Head-mounted displays can filter the signal electronically and then transmit light directly into the viewer's eyes.

Anaglyph and polarized glasses are distributed to audiences at 3D movies. Polarized and active shutter glasses are used with many home theaters. Head-mounted displays are used by a single person, but the input signal can be shared between multiple units.

=== Magnification (bioptics) ===
Glasses can also provide magnification that is useful for people with vision impairments or specific occupational demands. An example would be bioptics or bioptic telescopes which have small telescopes mounted on, in, or behind their regular lenses. Newer designs use smaller lightweight telescopes, which can be embedded into the corrective glass and improve aesthetic appearance (mini telescopic spectacles). They may take the form of self-contained glasses that resemble goggles or binoculars, or may be attached to existing glasses.

=== Recumbent glasses ===
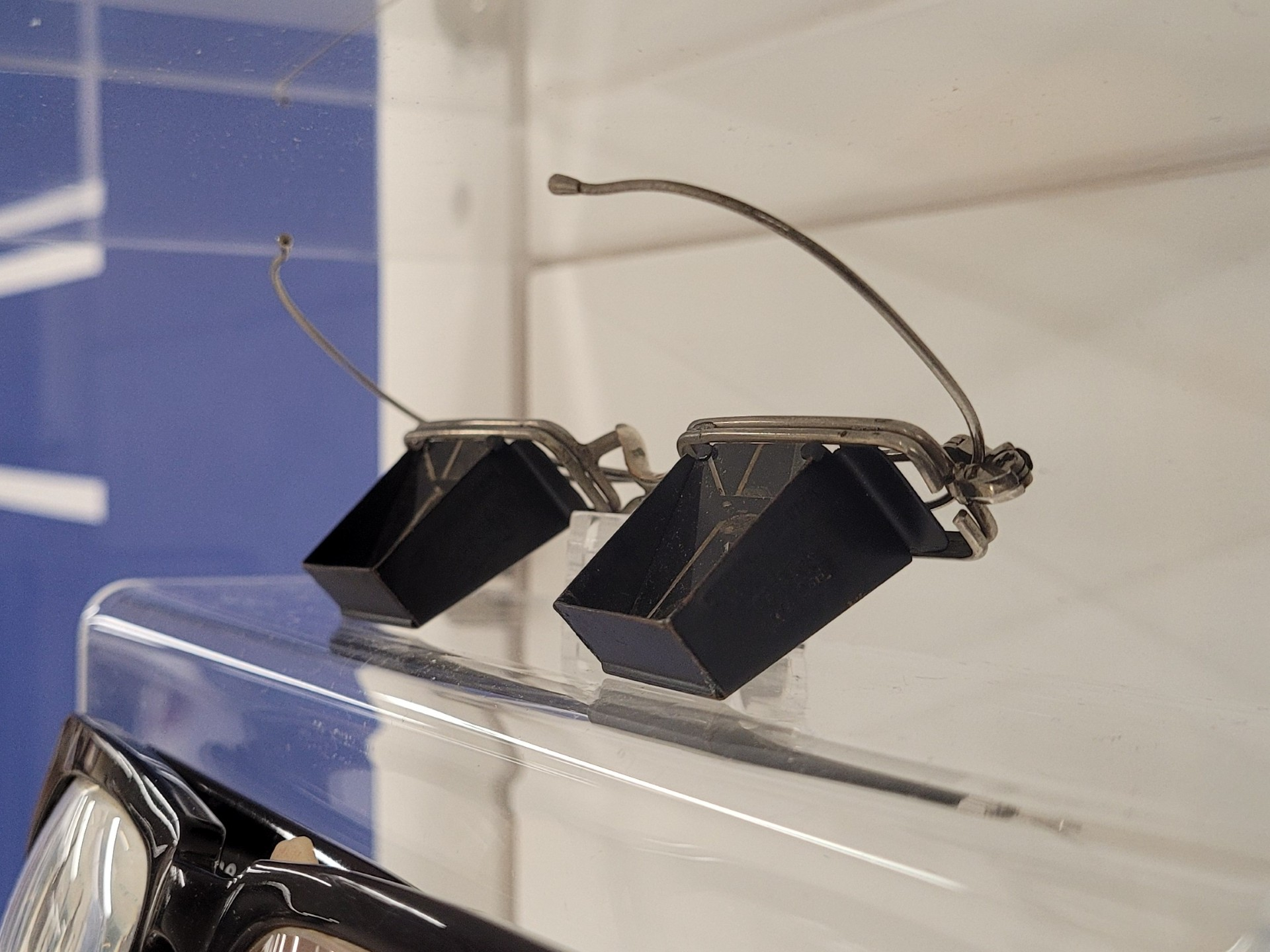
McKie Reid recumbent glasses, on display at Thackray Museum of Medicine.

Recumbent or prism glasses are glasses that use a prism with a 90° refraction to allow the wearer to read or view a screen while lying on their back. Developed by Liverpudlian ophthalmologist Andrew McKie Reid in the 1930s to assist people bedbound by chronic illness or spinal injury, recumbent glasses have more recently been marketed not simply as an assistive device but also as 'lazy glasses'. They do not assist with vision, although they can be worn over regular corrective glasses.

=== Yellow-tinted computer/gaming glasses ===
Yellow-tinted glasses are a type of glasses with a minor yellow tint. They perform a slight color correction, on top of reducing eyestrain from lack of blinking. They may also be considered minor corrective non-prescription glasses. Depending on the company, these computer or gaming glasses can also filter out high energy blue and ultra-violet light from LCD screens, fluorescent lighting, and other sources of light. This allows for reduced eye-strain. These glasses can be ordered as standard or prescription lenses that fit into standard optical frames.

=== Blue-light filtering glasses ===
By the end of the 2010s, glasses that filter out blue light from computers, smartphones and tablets became increasingly popular in response to concerns about problems caused by blue light overexposure. The problems claimed range from dry eyes to eye strain, sleep cycle disruption, up to macular degeneration which can cause partial blindness. They may also block out ultraviolet (UV) radiation. However, there is no measurable UV light from computer monitors. The problem of computer vision syndrome (CVS) a.k.a. Digital Eye Strain can result from focusing the eyes on a screen for long, continuous periods. Many times the glasses do not appear to have much of a tint, or, if any, a slight yellow tint, but they may be more heavily tinted.

Long hours of computer use (not blue light) may cause eye strain. Many eye symptoms caused by computer use will lessen after the usage of the computer is stopped. Decreasing evening screen time and setting devices to night mode will improve sleep. Several studies have shown that blue light from computers does not lead to eye diseases, including macular degeneration. The total amount of light entering the eyes can be adjusted without glasses using the screen brightness settings. Similarly, the blue light can often specifically be adjusted using the "night mode" of different operating systems, which can usually be activated outside of nighttime hours.

The American Academy of Ophthalmology (AAO) does not recommend special eyewear for computer use, although it recommends using prescription glasses measured specifically for computer screen distance (depending on individuals, but possibly 20–26 inches from the face), which are not the same as "blue-light blocking" glasses. The position of the College of Optometrists (UK) is that "the best scientific evidence currently available does not support the use of blue-blocking spectacle lenses in the general population to improve visual performance, alleviate the symptoms of eye fatigue or visual discomfort, improve sleep quality or conserve macula health."

== Frames ==
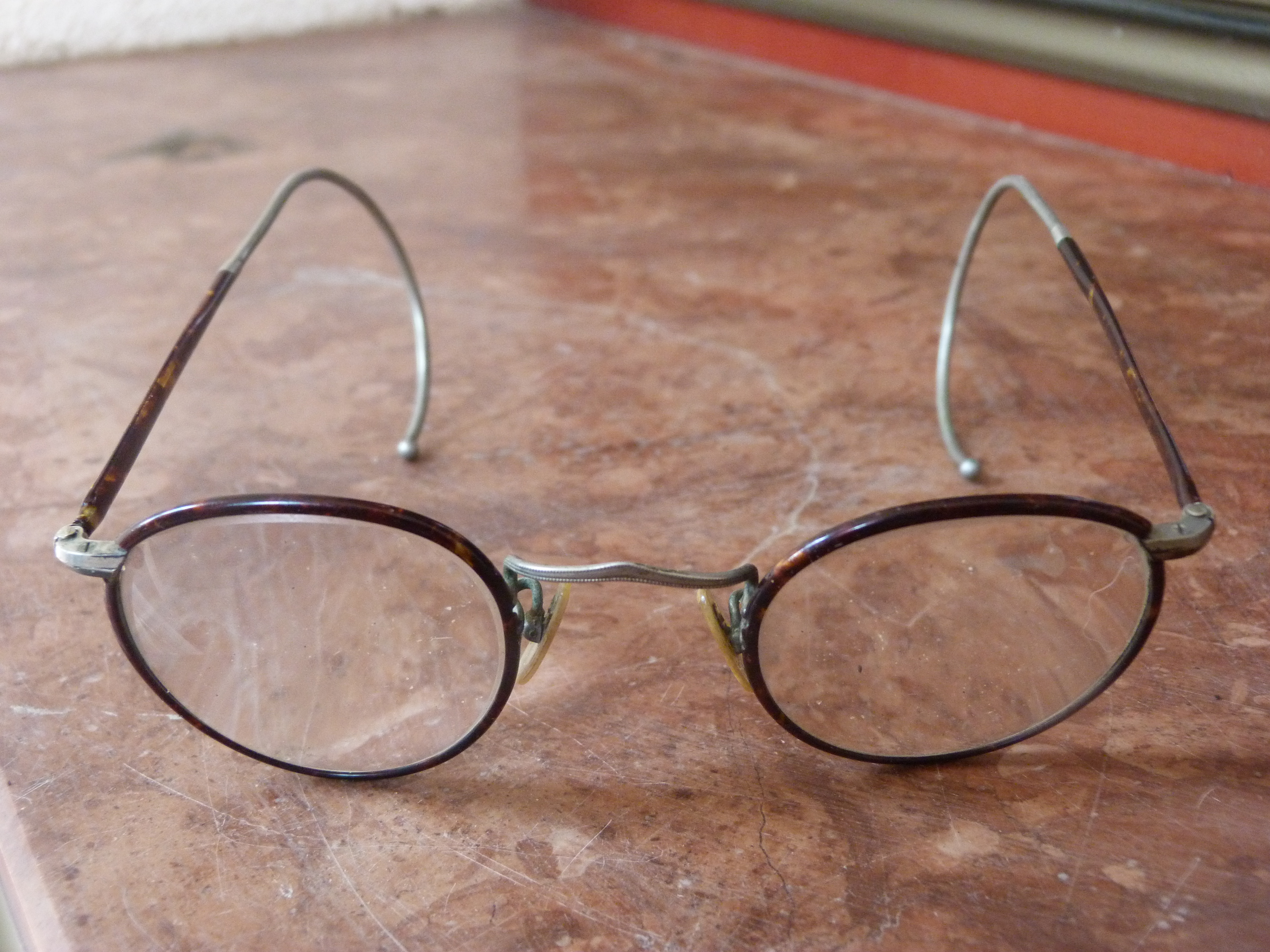
Glasses, c. 1920s, with springy cable temples

The ophthalmic frame is the part of a pair of glasses that is designed to hold the lenses in the proper position. Ophthalmic frames come in a variety of styles, sizes, materials, shapes, and colors.

=== Parts ===
- pair of eye wires or rims surrounding and holding the lenses in place
- bridge which connects the two eye wires
- chassis, the combination of the eye wires and the bridge
- top bar or brow bar, a bar just above the bridge providing structural support and/or style enhancement (country/Grandpa style). The addition of a top bar makes a pair of glasses aviator glasses
- pair of brows or caps, plastic or metal caps which fit over the top of the eye wires for style enhancement and to provide additional support for the lenses. The addition of brows makes a pair of glasses browline glasses
- pair of nose pads that allows a comfortable resting of the eye wires on the nose
- pair of pad arms connect the nose pads to the eye wires
- pair of temples (earpieces) on either side of the skull
- pair of temple tips at the ends of the temples
- pair of end pieces connect the eye wires via the hinges to the temples
- pair of frame-front end pieces
- pair of hinges connect the end pieces to the temples, allowing a swivel movement. Spring-loaded flex hinges are a variant that is equipped with a small spring that affords the temples a greater range of movement and does not limit them to the traditional, 90-degree angle.

=== Temple types ===
- Skull temples: bend down behind the ears, follow the contour of the skull and rest evenly against the skull
- Library temples: generally straight and do not bend down behind the ears. Hold the glasses primarily through light pressure against the side of the skull
- Convertible temples: used either as library or skull temples depending on the bent
- Riding bow temples: curve around the ear and extend down to the level of the ear lobe. Used mostly on athletic, children's, and industrial safety frames
- Comfort cable temples: similar to the riding bow, but made from a springy cable of coiled metal, sometimes inside a plastic or silicone sleeve. The tightness of the curl can be adjusted along its whole length, allowing the back to fit the wearer's ear curve perfectly. Used for physically active wearers, children, and people with high prescriptions (heavy lenses). See the image of 1920s frames above.

=== Materials ===
==== Plastic and polymer ====
- Cellulose acetate
- Optyl, a type of hypoallergenic material made especially for eyeglass frames. It features a type of elasticity that returns the material to its original shape.
- Cellulose propionate, a molded, durable plastic
- 3D-printed plastic using super-fine polyamide powder and Selective laser sintering processes—see Mykita Mylon (The frames can be 3D-printed by Fused Filament Fabrication for pennies of ABS, PLA or nylon)
- Nylon

==== Metal ====
Various metals and alloys may be used to make glasses, such as gold, silver, aluminum, beryllium, stainless steel, titanium, Monel, and nickel titanium.

==== Natural material ====
Natural materials such as wood, bone, ivory, leather and semi-precious or precious stones may also be used.

== Corrective lens shape ==
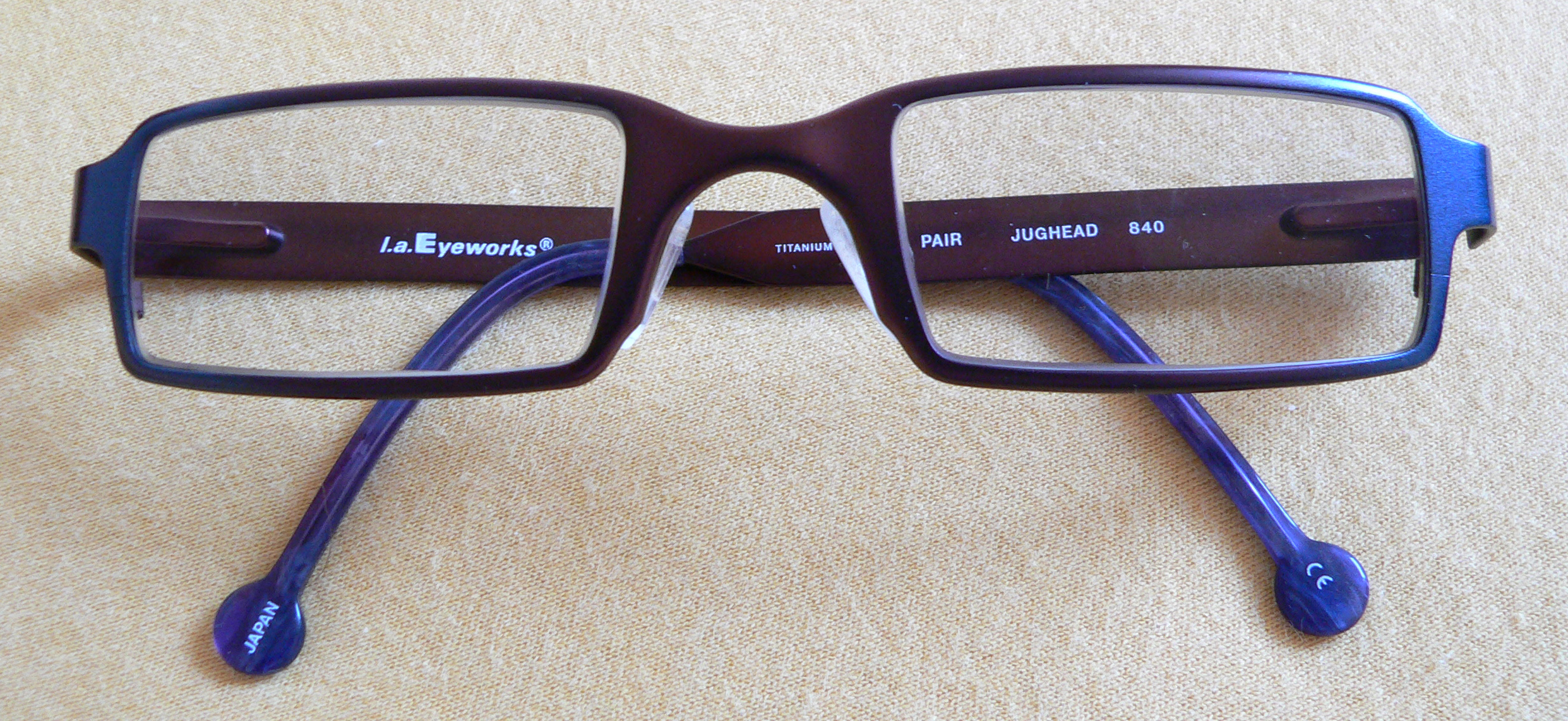
Modern glasses with a rectangular lens shape

Corrective lenses can be produced in many different shapes from a circular lens called a lens blank. Lens blanks are cut to fit the shape of the frame that will hold them. Frame styles vary and fashion trends change over time, resulting in a multitude of lens shapes. For lower power lenses, there are few restrictions, allowing for many trendy and fashionable shapes. Higher power lenses can distort peripheral vision and may become thick and heavy if a large lens shape is used. However, if the lens is too small, it can drastically reduce the field of view.

Bifocal, trifocal, and progressive lenses generally require a taller lens shape to leave room for the different segments while preserving an adequate field of view through each segment. Frames with rounded edges are the most efficient for correcting myopic prescriptions, with perfectly round frames being the most efficient. Before the advent of glasses as a fashion item, when frames were constructed with only functionality in mind, virtually all glasses were either round, oval, panto, rectangular, octagonal, or square. It was not until glasses began to be seen as an accessory that different shapes were introduced to be more aesthetically pleasing than functional.

== History ==
=== Precursors ===
Scattered evidence exists for use of visual aid devices in the Greek and Roman era, most prominently the use of an emerald by Emperor Nero as mentioned by Pliny the Elder.

The use of a convex lens to form an enlarged/magnified image was most likely described in Ptolemy's Optics (which survives only in a poor Arabic translation). Ptolemy's description of lenses was commented upon and improved by Ibn Sahl (10th century) and most notably by Alhazen (Book of Optics, c. 1021). Latin translations of Ptolemy's Optics and of Alhazen became available in Europe in the 12th century, coinciding with the development of "reading stones".

There are claims that single lens magnifying glasses were being used in China during the Northern Song dynasty (960–1127).

Robert Grosseteste's treatise De iride (On the Rainbow), written between 1220 and 1235, mentions using optics to "read the smallest letters at incredible distances". A few years later in 1262, Roger Bacon is also known to have written on the magnifying properties of lenses. The development of the first glasses took place in northern Italy in the second half of the 13th century.

Independently of the development of optical lenses, some cultures developed "sunglasses" for eye protection, without any corrective properties. For example, flat panes of smoky quartz were used in 12th-century China, (Note: Chinese judges wore dark glasses to hide their facial expressions during court proceedings.) and the Inuit have used snow goggles for eye protection.

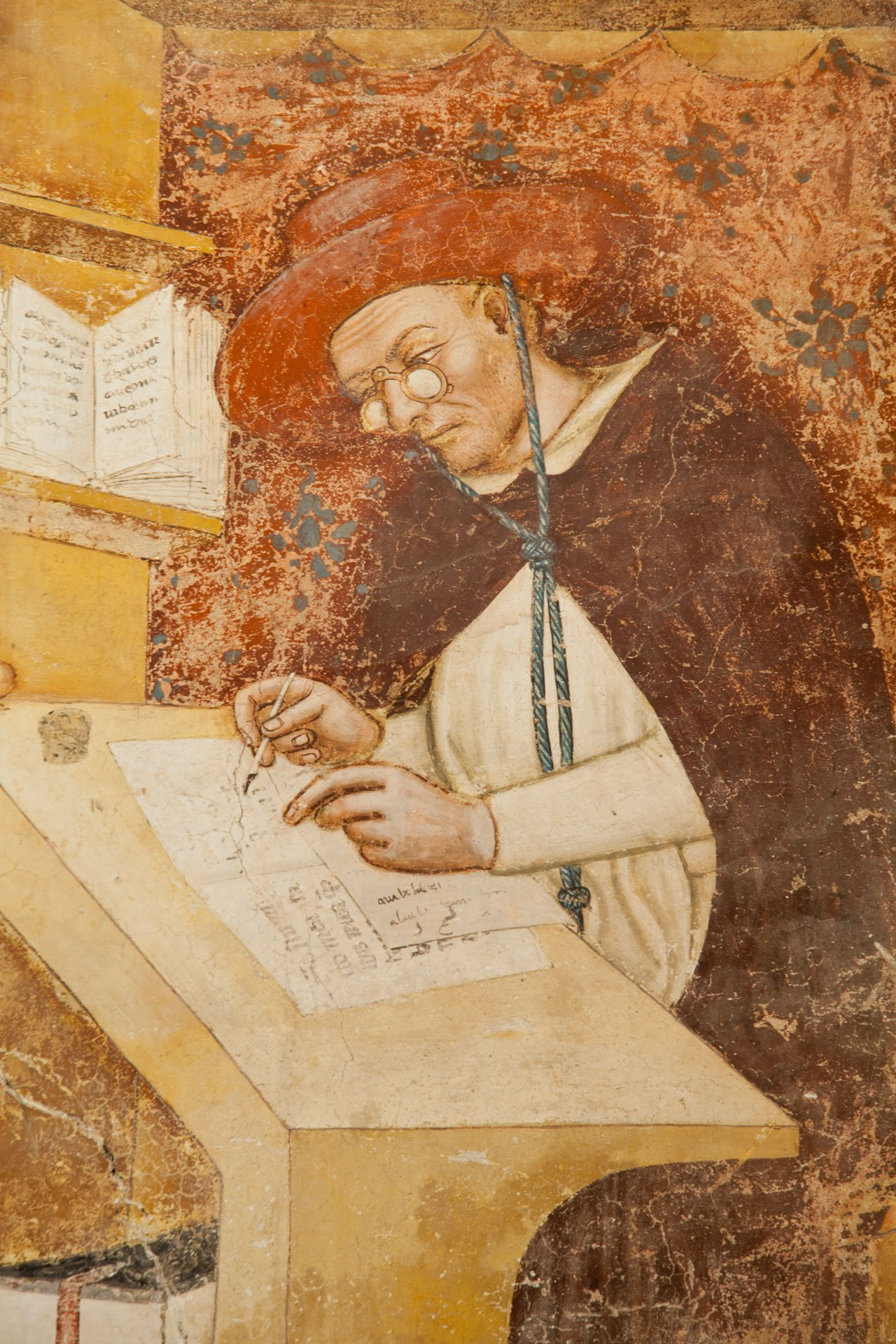
Detail of a portrait of the Dominican cardinal and renowned biblical scholar Hugh of Saint-Cher, painted by Tommaso da Modena in 1352

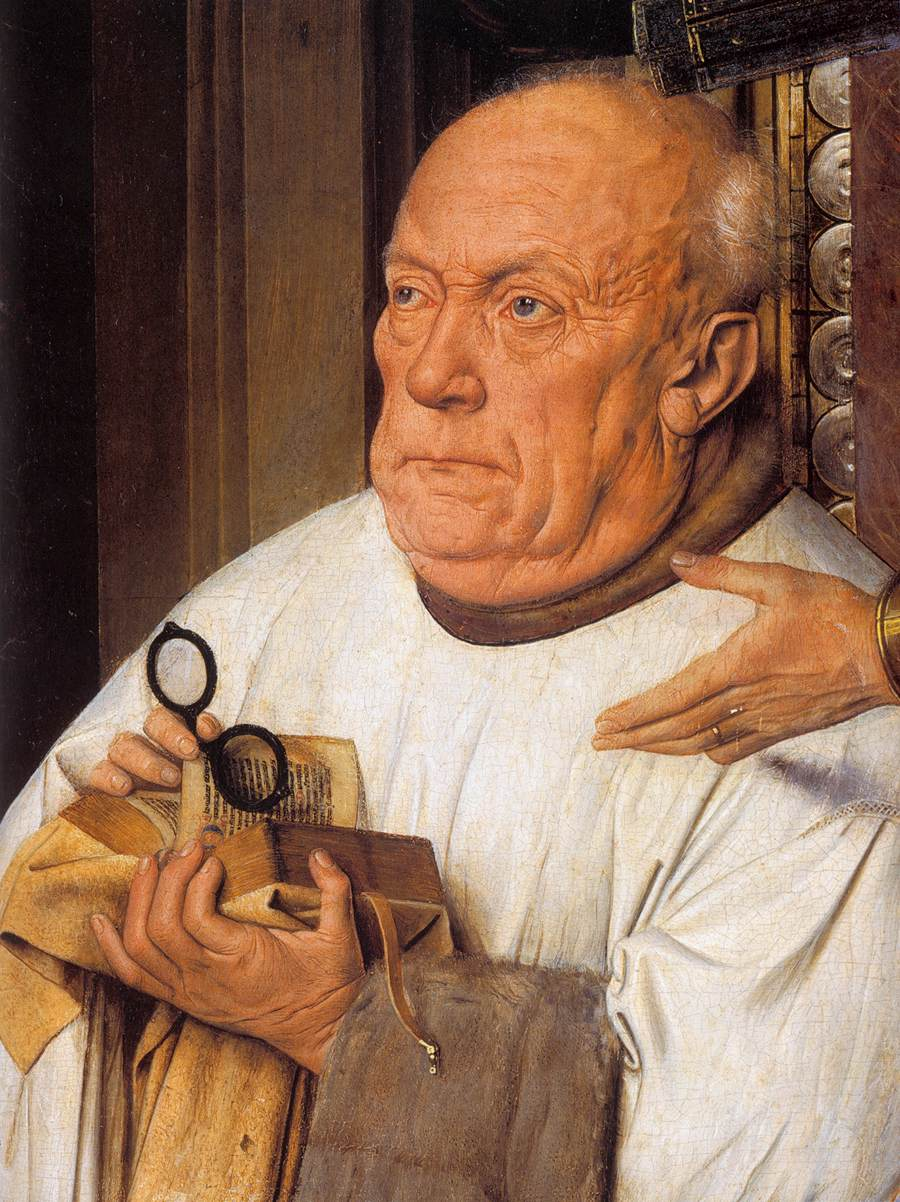
Jan van Eyck's Virgin and Child with Canon van der Paele (circa 1434–36) shows commissioner Joris van der Paele with reading glasses in hand.

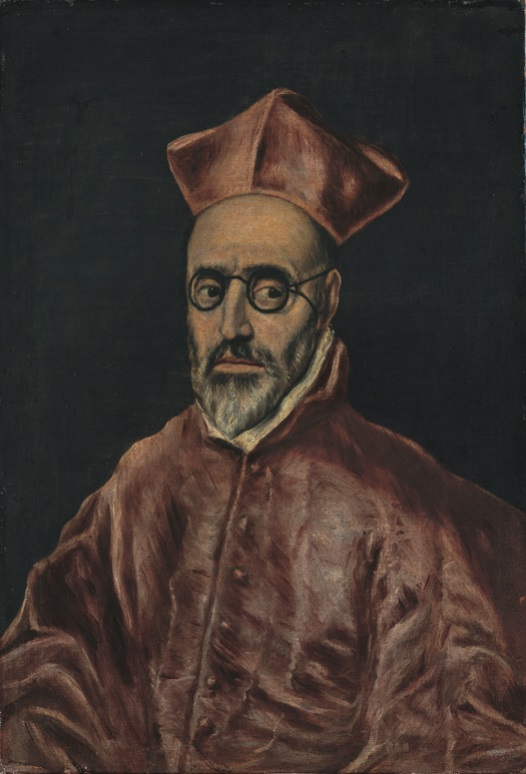
Portrait of Cardinal Fernando Niño de Guevara by El Greco, c. 1600, showing glasses with temples passing over and around the ears

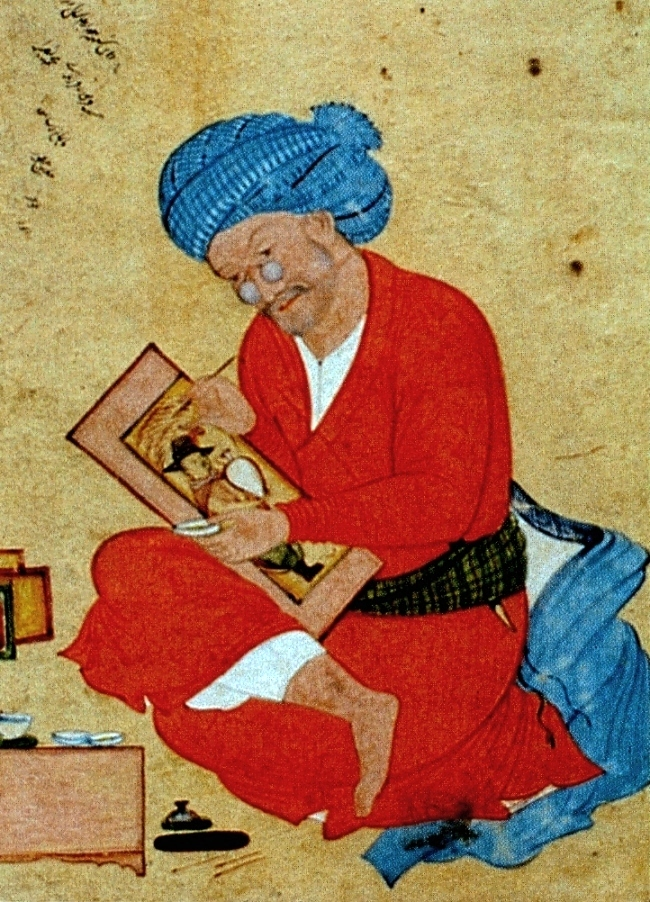
The Persian miniaturist Reza Abbasi wearing glasses, 1673.

=== Invention ===
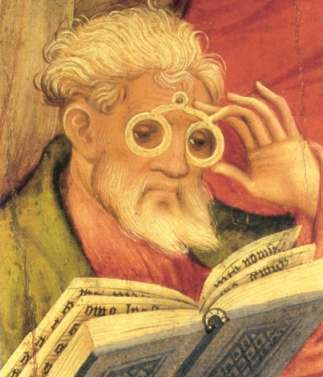
The Glasses Apostle by Conrad von Soest (1403)

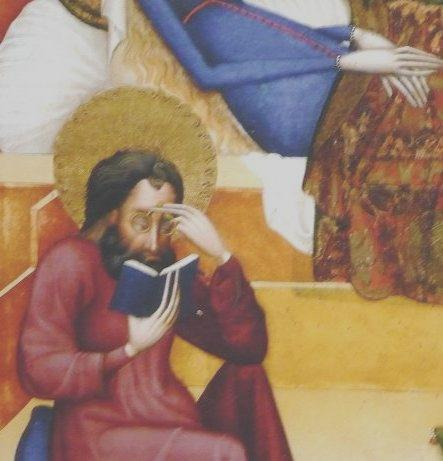
Seated apostle holding lenses in position for reading. Detail from Death of the Virgin, by the Master of Heiligenkreuz, c. 1400–1430 (Getty Center).

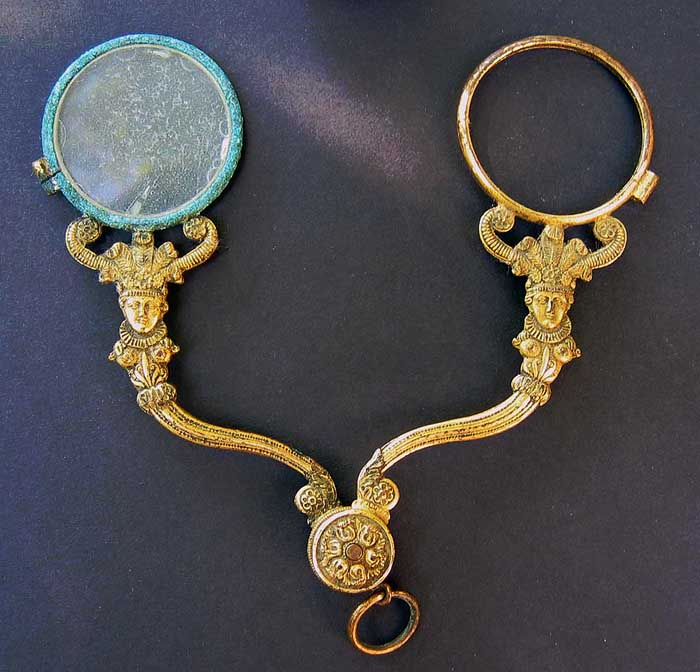
French Empire gilt scissors glasses (with one lens missing), c. 1805

The earliest recorded comment on the use of lenses for optical purposes was made in 1268 by Roger Bacon.

The first glasses were estimated to have been made in central Italy, most likely in Pisa or Florence, by about 1290: In a sermon delivered on 23 February 1306, the Dominican friar Giordano da Pisa (c. 1255–1311) wrote "It is not yet twenty years since there was found the art of making glasses, which make for good vision [...] And it is so short a time that this new art, never before extant, was discovered. [...] I saw the one who first discovered and practiced it, and I talked to him."

Giordano's colleague Friar Alessandro della Spina of Pisa (d. 1313) was soon making glasses. The Ancient Chronicle of the Dominican Monastery of St. Catherine in Pisa records: "Eyeglasses, having first been made by someone else, who was unwilling to share them, he [Spina] made them and shared them with everyone with a cheerful and willing heart." Venice quickly became an important center of manufacture, especially due to using the high-quality glass made at Murano. By 1301, there were guild regulations in Venice governing the sale of glasses and a separate guild of Venetian spectacle makers was formed in 1320. In the fourteenth century, they were very common objects: Francesco Petrarca says in one of his letters that, until he was 60, he did not need glasses, and Franco Sacchetti mentions them often in his Trecentonovelle.

The earliest pictorial evidence for the use of glasses is Tommaso da Modena's 1352 portrait of the cardinal Hugh de Saint-Cher reading in a scriptorium. Another early example would be a depiction of glasses found north of the Alps in an altarpiece of the church of Bad Wildungen (now in Germany) in 1403. These early glasses had convex lenses that could correct both hyperopia (farsightedness), and the presbyopia that commonly develops as a symptom of aging. Although concave lenses for myopia (near-sightedness) had made their first appearance in the mid-15th century, it was not until 1604 that Johannes Kepler published the first correct explanation as to why convex and concave lenses could correct presbyopia and myopia. (Note: In his treatise Ad Vitellionem paralipomena ('Emendations (or Supplement) to Witelo') (1604), Kepler explained how eyeglass lenses compensate for the distortions that are caused by presbyopia or myopia, so that the image is once again properly focused on the retina.)

Early frames for glasses consisted of two magnifying glasses riveted together by the handles so that they could grip the nose. These are referred to as "rivet spectacles". The earliest surviving examples were found under the floorboards at Kloster Wienhausen, a convent near Celle in Germany; they have been dated to circa 1400.

The world's first specialist shop for spectacles—what might be regarded today as an optician—opened in Strasbourg (then Holy Roman Empire, now France) in 1466.

==== Other claims ====
The 17th-century claim by Francesco Redi that Salvino degli Armati of Florence invented glasses in the 13th century has been exposed as erroneous.

Marco Polo is mistakenly claimed to have encountered glasses during his travels in China in the 13th century. However, no such evidence appears in his accounts. The earliest mentions of glasses in China occur in the 15th century and those Chinese sources state that glasses were imported.

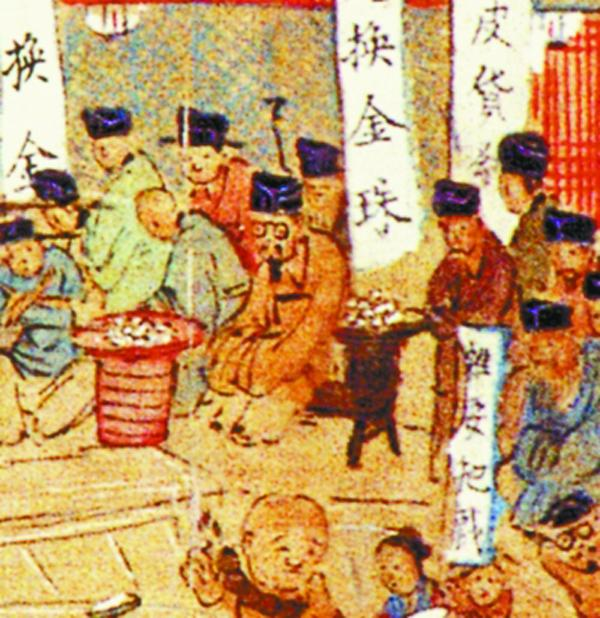
Man wearing glasses on the 16th century Ming dynasty Chinese painting The Bustling and Hustling of Nanjing (zh:南都繁会图)

In 1907, Professor Berthold Laufer speculated, in his history of glasses, that for glasses to be mentioned in the literature of China and Europe at approximately the same time it was probable that they were not invented independently, and after ruling out the Turks, proposed India as a location. (Note: Laufer, Berthold (1907), Geschichte der Brille (PDF), vol. 6, p. 26 Translation: I am interested in the remarks of Prof. J. HIRSCHBERG on the "History of the Invention of Glasses" published in the last issue of this journal (Volume VI, pp. 221–223) and the subsequent discussion by Prof. GÜPPERT. The book by HIRSCHBERG mentioned therein, in which his theory should be presented in detail, has not yet become accessible to me. I, therefore, limit my criticism of it as far as possible and prefer to prove, by means of new material from Chinese literature, that the view of the original invention of spectacles in India is the greatest probability. HIRSCHBERG theory is highly unlikely, as all previous experience has shown and contradicts analogies in cultural history and in the history of inventions in particular; Crystal spectacles appear in the European Middle Ages, in India, and in China, and from the historical point of view one can suppose from the outset that these inventions did not occur independently in each of these three cultural groups, but that a historical connection is here present.)

However, Joseph Needham stated that the mention of glasses in the Chinese manuscript Laufer used "in part" to credit the prior invention of them in Asia did not exist in older versions of that manuscript, and the reference to them in later versions was added during the Ming dynasty.

In 1971, Rishi Agarwal, in an article in the British Journal of Ophthalmology, states that Vyasatirtha was observed in possession of a pair of glasses in the 1520s, he argues that it "is, therefore, most likely that the use of lenses reached Europe via the Arabs, as did Hindu mathematics and the ophthalmological works of the ancient Hindu surgeon Sushruta", but all dates are given well after the existence of glasses in Italy was established, including significant shipments of glasses from Italy to the Middle East, with one shipment as large as 24,000 glasses, as well as a spectacles dispensary in Strasbourg in 1466.

=== Later developments ===
The American scientist Benjamin Franklin, who had both myopia and presbyopia, invented bifocals. Historians have from time to time produced evidence to suggest that others may have preceded him in the invention; however, a correspondence between George Whatley and John Fenno, editor of The Gazette of the United States, suggested that Franklin had indeed invented bifocals, and perhaps 50 years earlier than had been originally thought. The first lenses for correcting astigmatism were designed by the British astronomer George Airy in 1825.

Over time, the construction of frames for glasses also evolved. Early eyepieces were designed to be either held in place by hand or by exerting pressure on the nose (pince-nez). Girolamo Savonarola suggested that eyepieces could be held in place by a ribbon passed over the wearer's head, this in turn secured by the weight of a hat. The modern style of glasses, held by temples passing over the ears, was developed sometime before 1727, possibly by the British optician Edward Scarlett. These designs were not immediately successful, however, and various styles with attached handles such as "scissors-glasses" and lorgnettes were also fashionable from the second half of the 18th century and into the early 19th century.

In the early 20th century, Moritz von Rohr and Zeiss (with the assistance of H. Boegehold and A. Sonnefeld) developed the Zeiss Punktal spherical point-focus lenses that dominated the eyeglass lens field for many years. In 2008, Joshua Silver designed eyewear with adjustable corrective glasses. They work by using a built-in syringe to pump a silicone solution into a flexible lens.

Despite the popularity of contact lenses and laser corrective eye surgery, glasses remain very common, as their technology has improved. For instance, it is now possible to purchase frames made of special memory metal alloys that return to their correct shape after being bent. Other frames have spring-loaded hinges. Either of these designs offer dramatically better ability to withstand the stresses of daily wear and the occasional accident. Modern frames are also often made from strong, lightweight materials such as titanium alloys, which were not available in earlier times.

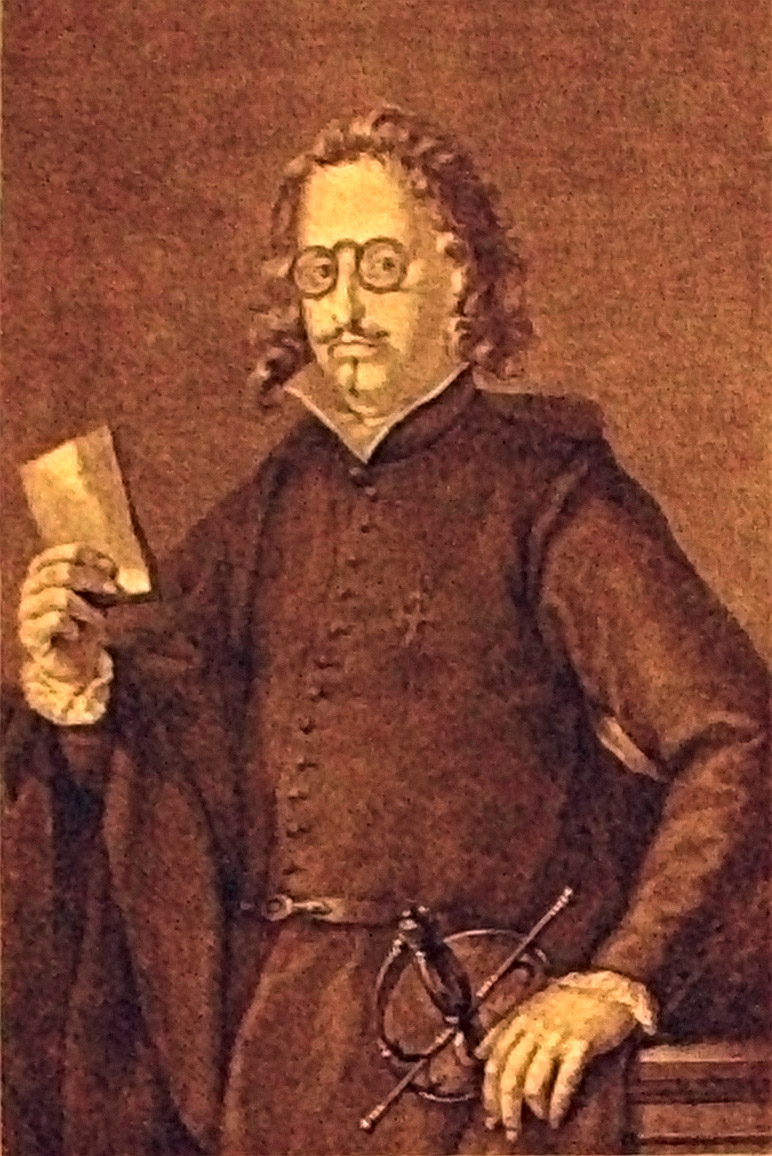
A portrait of Francisco de Quevedo y Villegas, 1580–1645

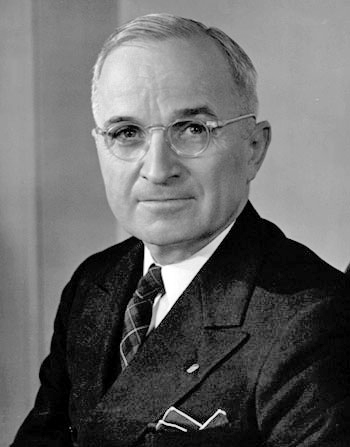
Harry S. Truman, 33rd President of the United States, had poor vision.

=== In fashion ===
In the 1930s, "spectacles" were described as "medical appliances". Wearing spectacles was sometimes considered socially humiliating. In the 1970s, fashionable glasses started to become available through manufacturers, and governments also recognized the demand for stylized eyewear.

Graham Pullin describes how devices for disability, like glasses, have traditionally been designed to camouflage against the skin and restore ability without being visible. In the past, design for disability has "been less about projecting a positive image as about trying not to project an image at all". Pullin uses the example of spectacles, traditionally categorized as a medical device for "patients", and outlines how they are now described as eyewear: a fashionable accessory. Much like other fashion designs and accessories, eyewear is created by designers, has reputable labels, and comes in collections, by season and designer. In recent years, it has become more common for consumers to purchase eyewear with non-prescription lenses as a fashion accessory.

=== Widespread availability ===
The availability of glasses to ordinary people is still an ongoing problem, with between 1 and 2.5 billion people worldwide lacking access to vision correction.

== Society and culture ==
=== Market ===
==== United States ====
The market for spectacles has been characterized as having highly inelastic demand. Advertising restrictions in the United States, for example, have correlated with higher prices, suggesting that adverts make the spectacles market more price-competitive. It has also been claimed to be monopolistically competitive, as in the case of Luxottica.

There are claims that insufficiently free market competition inflates the prices of frames, which cost an average of $25–$50 U.S. to make, to an average retail price of $300 in the United States. This claim is disputed by some in the industry.

The United States also prohibits the sale of glasses unless the user has a recent prescription from an optometrist or ophthalmologist, whereas in most of the world, glasses and contact lenses can be bought without needing to get a new eye exam first. This means that Americans who lose or break their glasses may be unable to see well until they can get, and pay for, an appointment with an optometrist. In most of the world, someone who has lost their glasses merely goes to the nearest store selling glasses and buys a replacement over the counter.

=== Redistribution ===
Some organizations like Lions Clubs International, Unite For Sight, ReSpectacle, and New Eyes for the Needy provide a way to donate glasses and sunglasses to people on low incomes or no income. Unite For Sight has redistributed more than 200,000 pairs.

=== Fashion ===
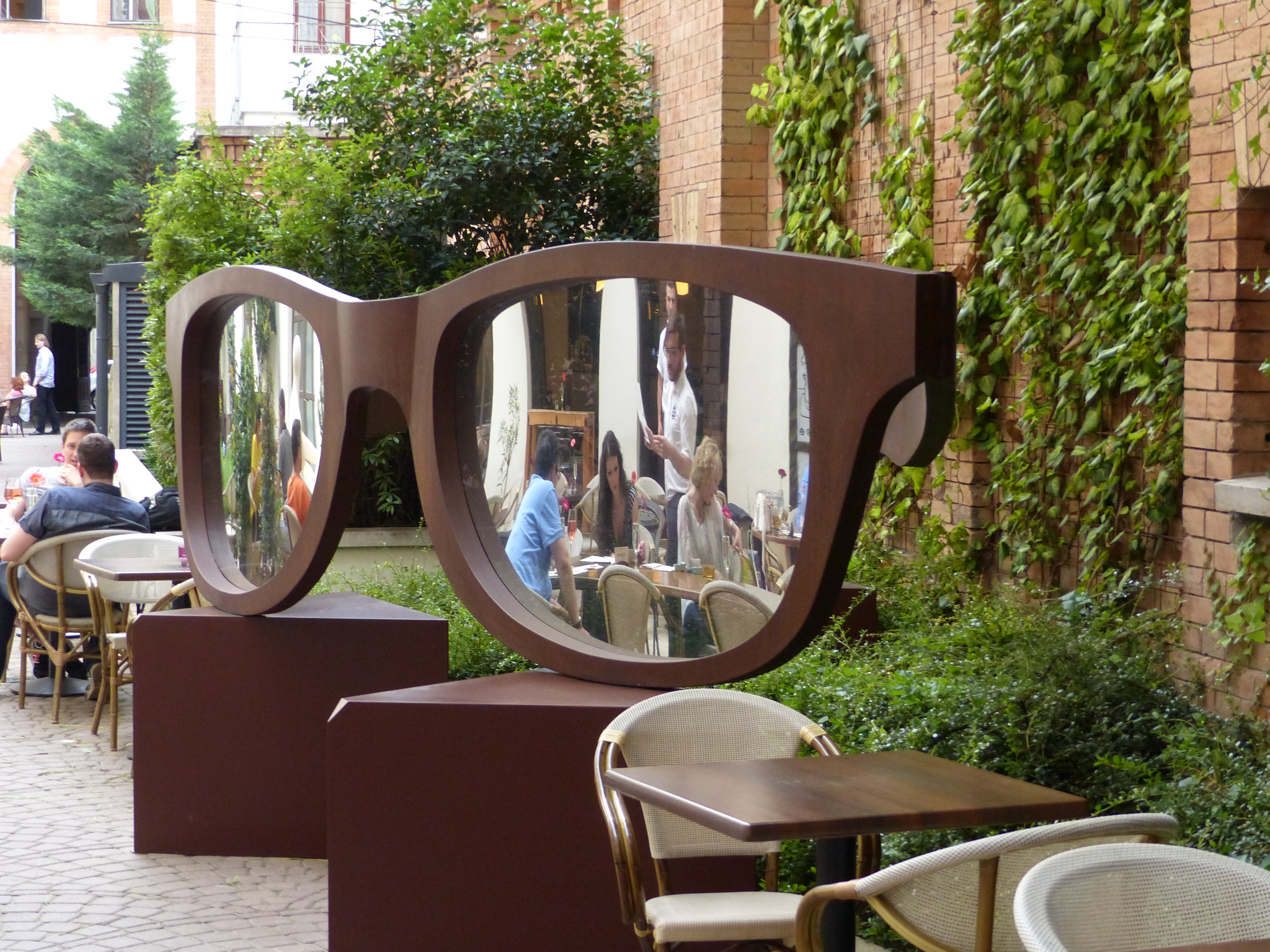
Glasses—Decoration, Prezi HQ, Budapest

Many people require glasses for the reasons listed above. There are many shapes, colors, and materials that can be used when designing frames and lenses that can be utilized in various combinations. Oftentimes, the selection of a frame is made based on how it will affect the appearance of the wearer. Some people with good natural eyesight like to wear glasses as a style accessory. In Japan, some companies ban women from wearing glasses.

==== Personal image ====
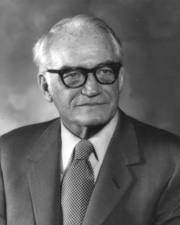
Former United States senator Barry Goldwater in horn-rimmed glasses

For most of their history, glasses were seen as unfashionable, and carried several potentially negative connotations: wearing glasses caused individuals to be stigmatized and stereotyped as pious clergymen—as those in religious vocation were the most likely to be literate and therefore the most likely to need reading glasses—elderly, or physically weak and passive. The stigma began to fall away in the U.S. in the early 1900s when the popular Theodore Roosevelt was regularly photographed wearing glasses, and in the 1910s when popular comedian Harold Lloyd wore a pair of horn-rimmed glasses as the "Glasses" character in his films.

In the United Kingdom, wearing glasses was characterized in the nineteenth century as "a sure sign of the weakling and the mollycoddle", according to Neville Cardus, writing in 1928. "Tim" Killick was the first professional cricketer to play while wearing glasses "continuously", after his vision deteriorated in 1897. "With their aid he placed himself in the forefront among English professionals of all-round abilities." The American tenor Jan Peerce, plagued with poor eyesight, credited comedian Steve Allen for normalizing and even popularizing the wearing of glasses in front of live television and stage audiences; prior to this, performers who read on early television were expected to squint or use contact lenses.

Since then, glasses have become an acceptable fashion item and often act as a key component in individuals' personal image. Musicians Buddy Holly and John Lennon became synonymous with the styles of eye-glasses they wore to the point that thick, black horn-rimmed glasses are often called "Buddy Holly glasses" and perfectly round metal eyeglass frames called "John Lennon glasses" (or, more recently, "Harry Potter glasses"). British comedic actor Eric Sykes was known in the United Kingdom for wearing thick, square, horn-rimmed glasses, which were in fact a sophisticated hearing aid that alleviated his deafness by allowing him to "hear" vibrations. Some celebrities have become so associated with their glasses that they continued to wear them even after taking other measures against vision problems: U.S. Senator Barry Goldwater and comedian Drew Carey continued to wear non-prescription glasses after being fitted for contacts and getting laser eye surgery, respectively.

Other celebrities have used glasses to differentiate themselves from the characters they play, such as Anne Kirkbride, who wore oversized 1980s-style round horn-rimmed glasses as Deirdre Barlow in the soap opera Coronation Street; and Masaharu Morimoto, who wears glasses to separate his professional persona as a chef from his stage persona as Iron Chef Japanese. In 2012, some NBA players wore lensless glasses with thick plastic frames like horn-rimmed glasses during post-game interviews, geek chic that draws comparisons to actor Jaleel White's infamous styling as TV character Steve Urkel.

In superhero fiction, glasses have become a standard component of various heroes' disguises as masks, allowing them to adopt a nondescript demeanor when they are not in their superhero personae: Superman is well known for wearing 1950s-style horn-rimmed glasses as Clark Kent, while Wonder Woman wears either round, Harold Lloyd-style glasses or 1970s-style bug-eye glasses as Diana Prince. Sailor Mercury is also known for her glasses and her visor. An example of the halo effect is seen in the stereotype that those who wear glasses are intelligent. This belief can have positive consequences for people who wear glasses, for example in elections. Studies show that wearing glasses increases politicians' electoral success, at least in Western cultures.

==== Styles ====
In the 20th century, glasses came to be considered a component of fashion; as such, various different styles have come in and out of popularity. Most are still in regular use, albeit with varying degrees of frequency.

- Aviator sunglasses
- Browline glasses
- Bug-eye glasses
- Cat eye glasses
- GI glasses
- Goggles
- Horn-rimmed glasses
- Lensless glasses
- Monocle
- Pince-nez
- Rimless glasses
- Sunglasses
- Wayfarer sunglasses
- Windsor glasses

== See also ==
- Adjustable-focus eyeglasses
- Baden-Powell's unilens
- Eye examination
- Eyeglass prescription
- History of optics
- Plurale tantum
- X-ray vision

== General and cited bibliography ==
- Elborough, Travis (2021). Through The Looking Glasses: The Spectacular Life of Spectacles (Hardcover). London: Little Brown. ISBN 978-1-4087-1284-9.
- Ilardi, Vincent (2007), Renaissance Vision from Spectacles to Telescopes, Philadelphia: American Philosophical Society, ISBN 9780871692597.
- Needham, Joseph (1962), "Part 1", Science & Civilisation in China, vol. IV, Cambridge, England: Cambridge University Press. Reprint: ISBN 9780521058025.
