= Will Taggart =

Will Taggart is a guitarist and a former School of Rock All Star. In 2014, the episode "May Be the Last Time" of True Blood on HBO featured the song "Open the Gates" co-written by Taggart and Derrick Schneider. They created "Open the Gates" at the age of 14 while playing in the hard rock band Rapid Fire. Taggart was the lead guitarist of Rapid Fire, which performed at the 2010 Bamboozle Festival at the Meadowlands Sports Complex in East Rutherford, New Jersey.

== Early life and education ==
After growing up in Summit, New Jersey, Taggart graduated from Morristown-Beard School in Morristown, New Jersey in 2013. During his studies, he performed in the school's Contemporary Music Workshop. Taggart served as co-president of the workshop during his senior year. After high school, Taggart began the Bandier program for Music and the Entertainment Industries in the Setnor School of Music at Syracuse University in Syracuse, New York. He hosted "The Fah-Show Show" on WERW, a student-run, free-form radio station at the university, from 2013 until his graduation in 2017.

== Musical career ==
Taggart started playing guitar at the age of eight. Since then, he has performed at several venues in the New York City metropolitan area. These venues have included Webster Hall in Manhattan, Stone Pony in Asbury Park, New Jersey, and Gramercy Theatre in Manhattan. Taggart has also performed at Red Rocks Amphitheatre in Morrison, Colorado and the Gathering of the Vibes festival in Bridgeport, Connecticut. In high school he played guitar and bass for his band Sauce. In 2014 he recorded a musical project with his cousins Ben and Jonah Wolfson under the band name Cuz. They recorded their first release "The Mustard EP" in May 2014. It was released in July 2014 on Bandcamp. Since his time at Syracuse University he formed the band Pizza Party with friends and fellow students. They released two singles in 2015 and a self-titled EP in 2016. Starting in summer of 2017, Taggart began working on a solo project called Sun Dog where he wrote and recorded all the music himself. In addition to Sun Dog, Will was also the bassist in R&B/Funk group Malik & The Loved Ones fronted by Malik Lovesyall. After Malik & The Loved Ones was dissolved in 2018, Taggart began to refocus on his project Sun Dog by creating a live band to play the songs he had written. After performing around Los Angeles for two years and recording their first EP, the band was renamed Forestline and features Taggart on guitar and vocals, Nick Coggiola on bass, and Joe Fournier on keyboards and background vocals. Their first single "Waves" is slated to be released on Sun Dog Records on October 14 with a second single "First Time in a While" slated for October 28. The full EP will be available on November 11, 2021.

== New Eyes for the Needy ==
Taggart volunteered for New Eyes for the Needy's fund raising concert in New Jersey from 2009 to 2013. New Eyes for the Needy, a national nonprofit organization founded in 1933, supports the purchase of glasses for people who cannot afford them. Taggart chaired the concert from 2011 to 2013. In 2010, the New Jersey State Legislature honored his service with a joint legislative resolution. Assemblywoman Nancy Munoz presented the resolution to Taggart during the New Eyes for the Needy concert.
