= Adjustable-focus eyeglasses =

Eyeglasses with manually adjustable focal length

Adjustable focus eyeglasses are eyeglasses with an adjustable focal length. They compensate for refractive errors (such as presbyopia) by providing variable focusing, allowing users to adjust them for desired distance or prescription, or both.

Bifocals and progressive lenses are static, in that the user has to change their eye position to look through the portion of the lens with the focal power corresponding to the distance of the object. This usually means looking through the top of the lens for distant objects and down through the bottom of the lens for near objects. Adjustable focus eyeglasses have one focal length, but it is variable without having to change where one is looking.

Possible uses for such glasses are to provide inexpensive eyeglasses for people from low-income groups, developing countries, third world countries or to accommodate for presbyopia.

== Methods ==
There are two basic methods to achieve variable focal length: electro-optical and opto-mechanical.

Electro-optical often uses liquid crystals as the active medium. Applying an electric potential to the liquid changes the refraction of the liquid.

Early work on opto-mechanical methods was done by Martin Wright. Opto-mechanical spectacles allow focus control by the wearer via movement of a small slider located on top of the bridge. The user adjusts the lens for optical clarity at the desired distance. They are a combination of rigid and flexible lenses that can change prescription to enable sharp focus at various distances (from infinity up to 13"). The appropriate addition range depends on the user's level of refractive error. A tiny mechanism, actuated by the slider, simultaneously controls both flexible lenses to assure appropriate near vision tracking in both eyes.

Another type of opto-mechanical lens is the design of Joshua Silver, and uses liquid pressure against a diaphragm to control focus of a lens. These lenses were meant to provide improved vision without prescription by an optometrist, since these professionals are in short supply in many countries. Each eyepiece encloses a reservoir of fluid silicone and the user adjusts the level of fluid with a dial until they are satisfied with the result.

Stephen Kurtin also had a product based on what appears to be a related design called Superfocus (originally TruFocals). The company has since gone bankrupt.

== Advantages ==
Unlike with bifocals, near-vision correction is achieved over the entire field of view, in any direction. Distance vision corrections are made by re-adjusting the lens for distance, instead of by tilting and/or rotating the head to view object through the best part of the lens for the distance. Adjustable focus lenses, like single-focus lenses, also reduce image-jump and spatial distortion in the field of view associated with traditional multi-focal lenses. Additionally, the ideal near-vision correction can be achieved with precision, because the variable lenses emulate the focusing action of the youthful (non-presbyopic) eye.

== Disadvantages ==
The focal distance is changed by a mechanism located on the glasses, requiring periodic adjustment as the user switches their gaze to nearer or farther objects.

== See also ==
- Intraocular lens "CrystaLens" replaces the normal eye lens with an adjustable one using the eye's focusing muscles to focus.
- Electrowetting is a technology used to electrically adjust the path of light
