= Lensless glasses =

Glasses lacking lenses, worn for fashion

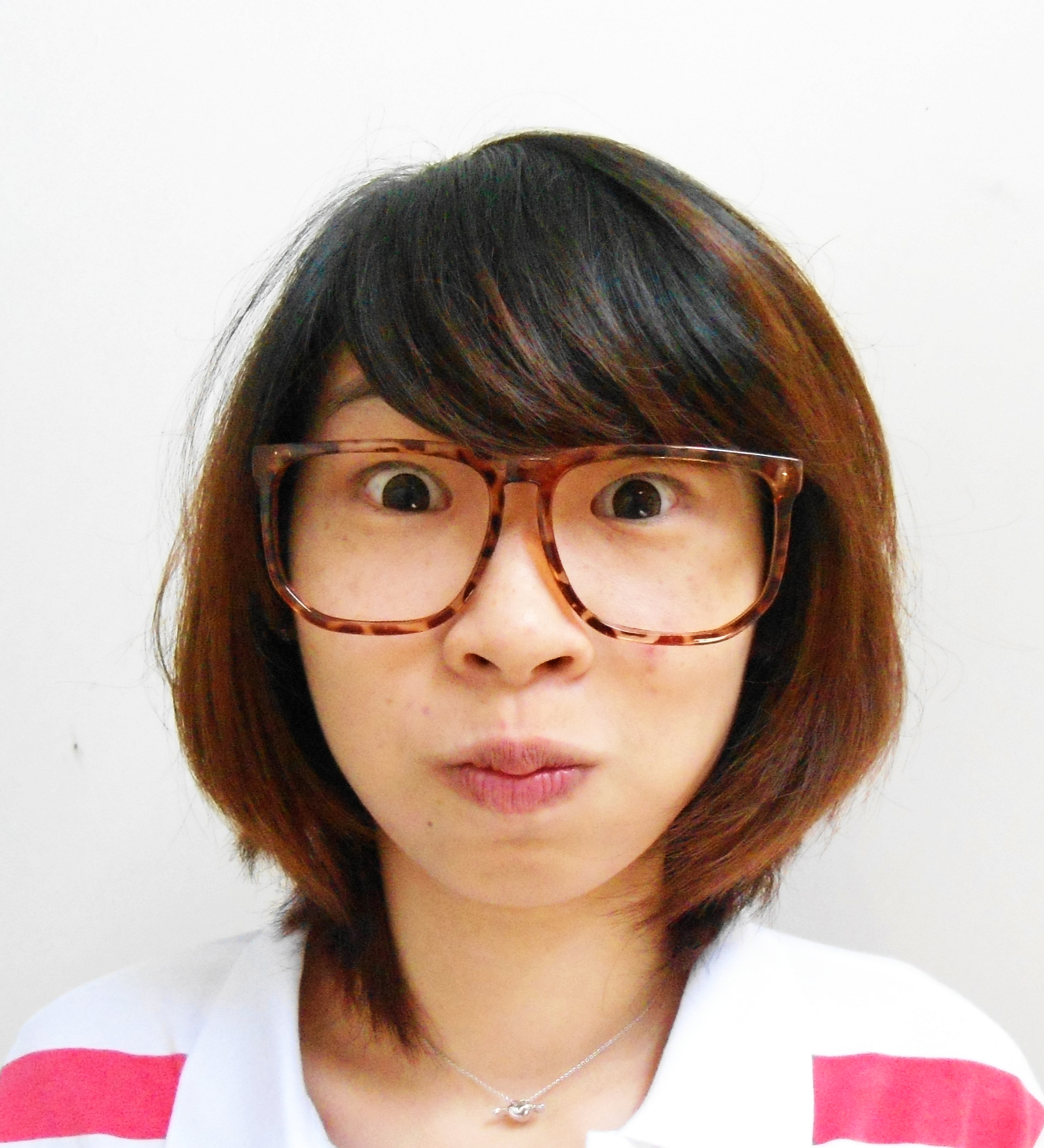
A woman wearing lensless glasses.

Lensless glasses are glasses that lack lenses. They are worn solely for aesthetic or fashion purposes, having no function in vision correction or eye protection. The frames are usually oversized, and commonly all black in color. They may be worn in conjunction with contact lenses.

== Overview ==
Lensless glasses first became popular in Japan in the 1990s. The trend died out, but has resurged recently in China and Taiwan.

Advantages of lensless glasses are that they do not fog or reflect, and there is no lens that will touch long eyelashes and eyelash extensions.

Maison Martin Margiela released gold frames that are lensless and half-rimless.

== NBA ==
Many NBA players wear lensless glasses with thick plastic frames like horn-rimmed glasses during the post-game show, geek chic that draws comparisons to Steve Urkel. Russell Westbrook of the Oklahoma City Thunder, known for his red frames claimed to have started the trend when he entered the league in 2008 but LeBron James of the Miami Heat disagreed. James' teammate Dwyane Wade calls them "nerd glasses." After the Heat won Game 4 of the 2012 NBA Finals Wade took it a step farther by wearing flip-up sunglasses. Wade said he was, "paying a little homage to Dwayne Wayne tonight", referencing Kadeem Hardison's popular character from A Different World.

== See also ==
- Belay glasses
