= New Eyes for the Needy =

New Eyes official website logo

New Eyes for the Needy is a non-profit organization started in 1932 as New Eyes (incorporated 1948) and based in Short Hills, New Jersey, which provides people in the United States with eyeglasses and sends recycled eyeglasses to needy people overseas.

== History ==
The organization was founded by Julia Lawrence Terry in 1932 in Short Hills, New Jersey. Terry worked in the Red Cross during the Great Depression and realized the need for eyeglasses in the US. Area residents donated basement space for sorting eyeglasses. By the end of the 1940s, the organization was receiving an average of 1,194 glasses monthly. "Old age glasses" were sent to hospitals in New York City and nursing homes in Kentucky. New Eyes was also featured in Woman's Day and Parade magazine articles, and had its first television appearance on WCBS. As the organization grew, the Junior Service League of the Oranges and Retired Men's Club in Short Hills began to volunteer. In 1947, the Junior Service League of Short Hills took over New Eyes with the passing of Mrs. Terry. By 1949, 455 people per month were receiving "new eyes". In the 1950s, New Eyes for the Needy had 55 volunteers sorting eyeglasses. The organization averaged 25–35 mailbags of glasses weekly. New Eyes was set up as an independent organization, a community project under the Junior League of Oranges. The Jewelry Committee was formed by Connie Hurd.

=== 1960s and 1970s ===
New Eyes opened its new headquarters at 549 Millburn Avenue in the 1960s. At this location, the organization began accepting items for consignment in the jewelry showroom. Additions to the building allowed for a mailroom and second-floor jewelry showroom and sales. The Millburn Old Guard began volunteering at New Eyes for the Needy, which would become a tradition lasting over 40 years. In 1968, the organization paid off its mortgage. By 1979, over 100,000 pairs of eyeglasses were being shipped overseas. $150,000 in grants were allocated to hospitals and medical schools. New Eyes broke the 1,000,000 mark in eyeglass donations for one year, which allowed for the purchase of over 10,000 new prescription glasses.

=== 1980s and 1990s ===
Income from scrap metal declined in the 1980s, while the number of requests for new eyeglasses rose. This marked the start of the eyeglass voucher program. This decade marked the beginning of computer use in the offices and the 50th anniversary of the organization, which was attended by Governor and Mrs. Tom Kean. New Eyes received $35,000 in grants during the 1990s. It launched its first direct mail campaign for new donations and ran a PSA campaign featuring comedian Steve Allen. Susannah Likins became the new executive director in 1993.

=== 2000s ===
In the past decade, New Eyes for the Needy raised reimbursement rates for the voucher program for the first time since the program began. It also introduced its website as of 2023, located at www.new-eyes.org. Its first fundraising gala, Hocus Focus, took place in 2006. In 2011-12, in partnership with social service agencies and optical dispensers across the country, New Eyes helped 6,066 underserved residents of the U.S. to get the eyeglasses they needed but could not afford. Currently, Susan Dyckman is the organization's executive director. New Eyes celebrated its 80th anniversary in November 2012, marking the event with a gala honoring Honorary Chair actor Jake Gyllenhaal.

The group's vision or mission statement is: "To empower children and adults in the United States and overseas with the improved vision they need to pursue a better quality of life for themselves, their families and their communities. New Eyes' mission is to purchase new prescription glasses through a voucher program for children and adults in the United States who cannot afford glasses on their own. new Eyes accepts, recycles and distributes donated glasses for poor people overseas."

== Voucher program ==
New Eyes for the Needy purchases prescription eyeglasses for indigent people in the U.S. through a voucher program. Eligible clients can receive a voucher by working with a social service agency or a school nurse. Clients can present a New Eyes voucher to any participating local optical dispenser, who fits the client with the proper prescription eyeglasses. The dispenser then receives reimbursement directly from New Eyes.

To be eligible for the program, applicants must be in financial need, have had a recent eye exam, and have no other resources available to them to pay for glasses, including federal or state programs or assistance from local charitable organizations. New Eyes does not pay for eye exams. A New Eyes voucher typically covers only the cost of a basic pair of single or bifocal eyeglasses.

== Funding ==
New Eyes relies on a variety of funding sources, including individual donations, grants, corporate gifts, special events and revenue from the Fabulous Finds Jewelry & Giftware Boutique. In 2012, Individual donations and corporate gifts made up 43% of revenue. Grants made up 25% of funding, jewelry sales from the showroom Fabulous Finds made up 14%, and scrap metal made up 3%.

== Donations and volunteer work ==
New Eyes for the Needy depends primarily on volunteer work and donations. A donation of $58 purchases one pair of prescription glasses for someone in need in the United States. Donations may be made by cash, check or credit card through New Eyes' website. New Eyes also recycles donated prescription glasses, reading glasses and sunglasses, and works with charitable organizations and small medical missions to distribute recycled glasses in developing nations.

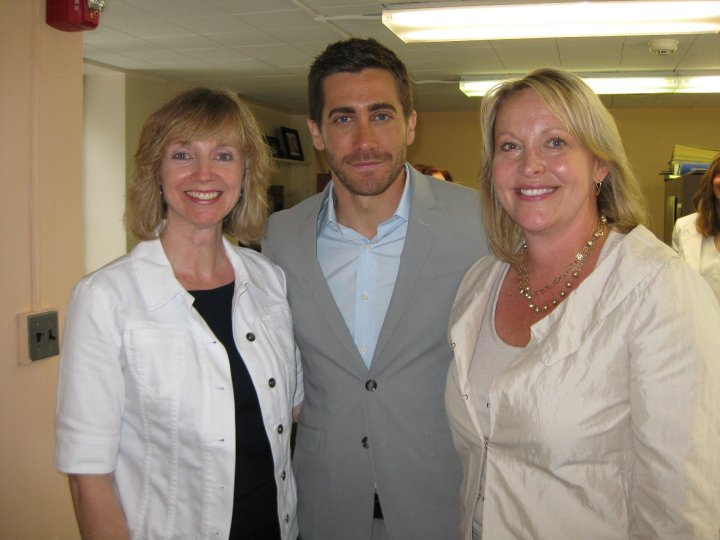
Jake Gyllenhaal with Executive Director Susan Dyckman and Treasurer Barb Daney

== Operations and accomplishments ==
=== 2007-2008 ===
New Eyes for the Needy is run by a 15 person Board of Trustees and runs mainly through volunteer action. It still operates out of its original home in New Jersey but has expanded to become globalized. In 2007-2008, the organization helped 5,845 United States citizens and 200,000 people overseas with their eye care needs. The company has been mentioned in the Newark Star Ledger, the Philadelphia Inquirer and ABC's Eyewitness News. The organization has had celebrity spokespeople such as Jake Gyllenhaal. In the fall of 2008, the organization was the subject of a school assignment for students at Seton Hall University as part of a public relations campaign assignment.

=== 2010-2011 ===
In 2010-2011, New Eyes distributed nearly 200,000 pairs of recycled eyeglasses to people living in 30 developing nations around the world. New Eyes secured awards totaling $71,000 in foundation grants.

International Eyeglass Recycling Program

- Acknowledged 243,000 pair of donated glasses
- Distributed 160,000 pair of glasses to people in 28 countries through small medical missions and Physicians for Peace, Feed The Children and Unite for Sight
- Expanded partnerships with for-profit entities such as MoralEyes, Warby Parker and Zeal Optics to continue regular donations of new reading glasses, sunglasses and frames for the recycling program

== See also ==
- Unite For Sight
- Lions Clubs International
