= GI glasses =

Eyeglasses issued by the American military to its service members

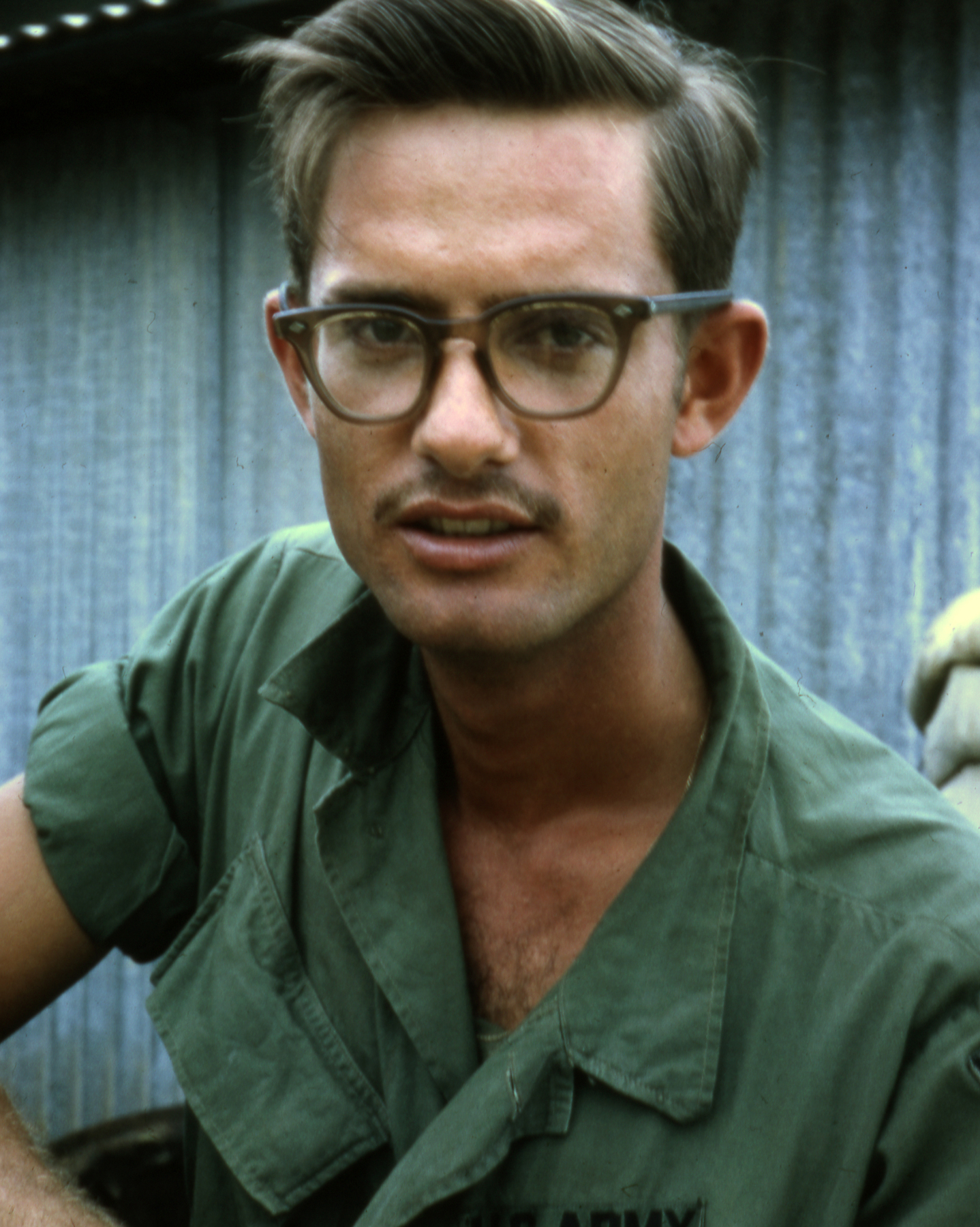
GI glasses, gray cellulose acetate, 1960s design

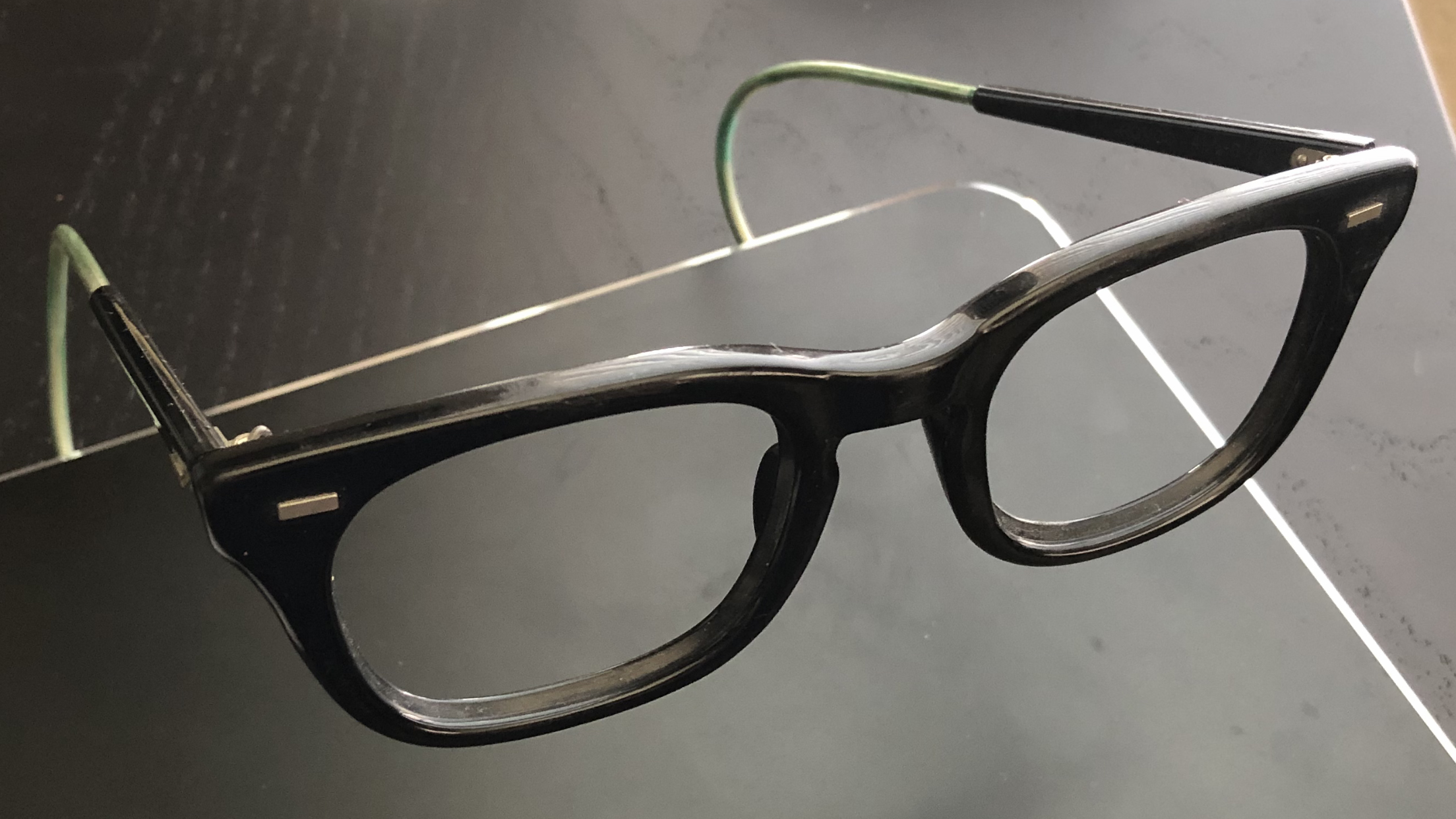
Army issue glasses from the mid-1980s

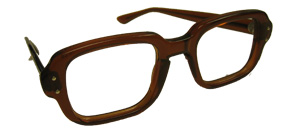
Male S9 ("MS9") GI glasses, 1990s design

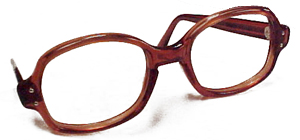
Female S9 ("FS9") GI glasses

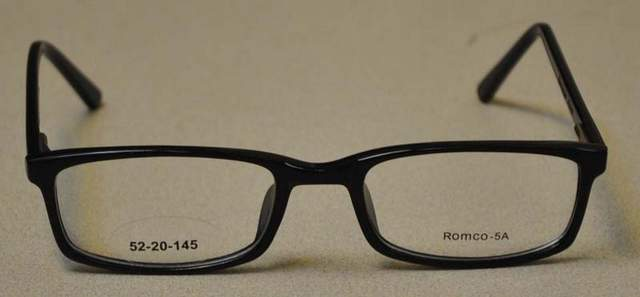
Model "5A" GI glasses, 2012 design

GI glasses are eyeglasses issued by the American military to its service members. Dysphemisms for them include the most common "birth control glasses" (BCGs) and other variants. At times in the US Navy they were called "Standard Navy Ugly Glasses" (SNUGs). Similar glasses (without metal) can be issued to inmates in state and federal prisons.

== History ==
The original version was designed for use with gas masks during World War II. It was wire-rimmed with cable temples and a "P3" lens shape. The design was a modification of the style used by the British military.

After World War II, the material was switched from nickel alloy wire to cellulose acetate. Initially gray cellulose acetate was used, but this was discontinued in 1968, with remaining stocks issued until exhausted. The replacement frames used black cellulose acetate.

In the late 1970s, the lens shape was re-designed to the "S9". Black "S9" frames were released for a brief period, before brown cellulose acetate replaced the black. The brown cellulose acetate frames were discontinued in 2012, and a new smaller unisex lens shape, the "5A", was introduced, with a black frame. The modern "5A" shape was designed by Rochester Optical, who is the exclusive manufacturer of the R-5A frame.

GI glasses are issued at government expense to new recruits at recruit training or Officer Candidate Schools in the United States military. When entering recruit training, service members may wear civilian glasses until government-issued ones are assigned, including but not limited to the BCG. Contact lenses are never permissible for these exercises. After recruit training, service members are permitted to wear Frame of Choice glasses which are conservative in design and color or contact lenses. The military offers annual replacements for those who qualify, and personnel may request the government issued glasses in addition to several varieties of more attractive eyewear, in clear and tinted lenses, as well as prescription gas mask inserts and inserts for government-funded eye protection and ballistic eyewear.

== Women's styles ==
- Frame, Spectacle, Female Style, Cellulose Acetate, Gray
- Frame, Spectacle, Female Style, Cellulose Acetate, Black (slight cat-eye)
- Frame, Spectacle, Female Style, Cellulose Acetate, Brown (slight bug-eye)

== Manufacturers ==
- Bausch & Lomb (B&L)
- Randolph Engineering
- ArtCraft
- Sellstrom
- Titmus
- USS ("Birth Control")
- Bushnell
- ROMCO
