= Scissors-glasses =

Variety of eyeglasses

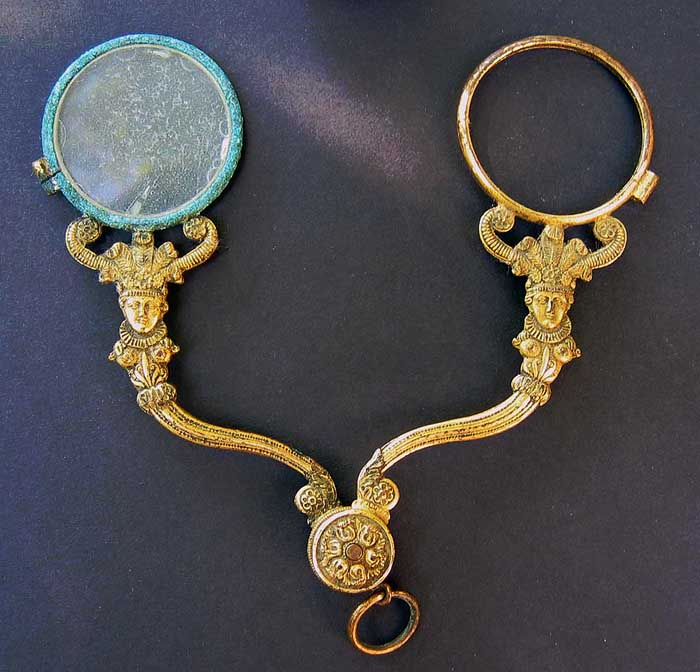
French Empire gilt scissors-glasses c. 1805

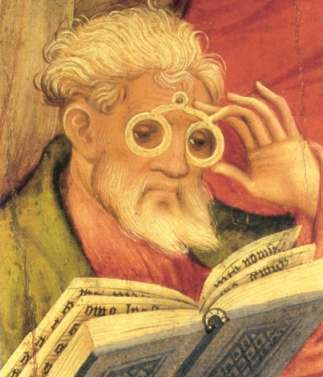
The Glasses Apostle by Conrad von Soest (1403)

Scissors-glasses (or binocles-ciseaux) are eyeglasses, normally used to correct distance vision, mounted on scissoring stems rather than on temple stems as modern eyeglasses are.

The invention of scissors-glasses solved the problem of the single-lensed monocle or "quizzing glass", thought to be tiresome to the eye, by providing two lenses on a Y-shaped frame. They usually had a ring in the end of the handle so that they could be worn on a ribbon or gold chain around the neck.

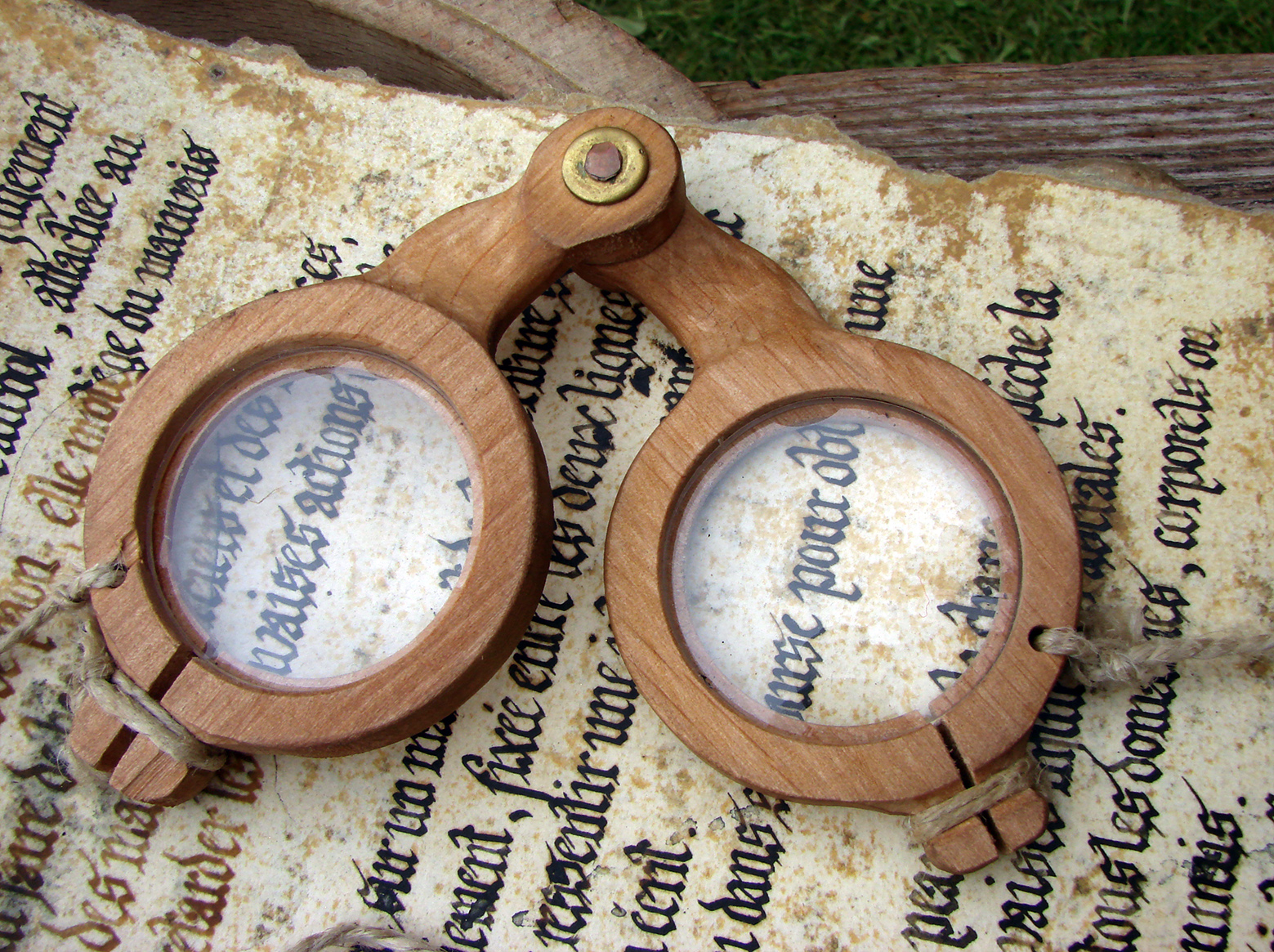
Replication medieval scissors-glasses

Elegant examples, often gilded and highly ornamented, became common among the more fashionable members of French and German society in the second half of the 18th century. George Washington, Lafayette and Napoleon used scissors-glasses. In French they are called binocles or binocles-ciseaux, and the French scissors-glasses are more delicate and ornate and more of a fashion accessory than those made in other parts of Europe. The lorgnette may have developed from scissors-glasses.
