= Joshua Silver =

British physicist

Joshua D. Silver is a British physicist whose discoveries have included a new way to change the curvature of lenses, with a significant application for the low-cost manufacture of corrective lenses and adjustable spectacles, especially in low-income countries.

Silver began his academic career in the Department of Atomic and Laser Physics at the University of Oxford, ultimately leading a research group. Professor Silver is currently the chief executive of the Centre for Vision in the Developing World at the University of Oxford, working to research the scope of and potential solutions to the problems of refractive error and low vision in the developing world.

== Research ==
While studying mirrors, Silver discovered a new way to change the curvature of lenses. He applied this to create a new form of liquid-filled corrective lens, that could be easily adjusted by the wearer to correct the vision of over 90% of people requiring correction. This is particularly useful for people in developing countries where specially trained optometrists are not available. In 1996 he formed a company, Adaptive Eyecare, to develop these adaptive ophthalmic lenses in partnership with the UK Government's Department for International Development, for distribution in developing countries. The company has developed prototype adaptive spectacles (called AdSpecs) that can correct both far-sighted and near-sighted people, and these spectacles have been trialled in several countries in Africa and Asia. So far 30,000 of Silver's lenses have been distributed in 15 countries.

In 2007 his research focused on using spectroscopy to understand the physics of highly charged ions (produced using the university's electron beam ion trap (EBIT)). This research has application in understanding extreme plasma environments such as fusion tokamaks and stellar atmospheres.

== Political activism ==
In 2016, Professor Silver complained to West Midlands Police that British Home Secretary Amber Rudd had committed a hate crime while giving a political speech at the Conservative Party conference. During an interview with Andrew Neil on BBC2's Daily Politics, Silver said: "I didn’t actually see the speech but I’ve read the draft. And I’ve looked at all the feedback that there was to the speech. I’ve read the speech carefully and I’ve looked at all the feedback. It’s discriminating against foreigners, you pick on them and say we want to give jobs to British people and not to foreigners. It was interpreted that way." During the subsequent discussion on the programme, former Conservative Party leader Michael Howard responded by stating: "Of course it wasn't a hate incident... What Amber Rudd said was no different from Gordon Brown [former Labour Party prime minister] when he said there should be British jobs for British workers. I think Mr. Silver should be thoroughly ashamed of himself because what he's doing is to bring a well-intentioned piece of legislation into disrepute." The BBC subsequently reported that West Midlands Police had not formally investigated the speech, but had recorded it as a "non-crime hate incident" in accordance with national policy guidelines.

In early 2020, Silver said he would bring a case before the Court of Justice of the European Union. The case would answer whether or not British Citizens would lose their European Citizenship following Brexit.

== See also ==
- Adjustable-focus eyeglasses
- Eyewear
