= Baden-Powell's unilens =

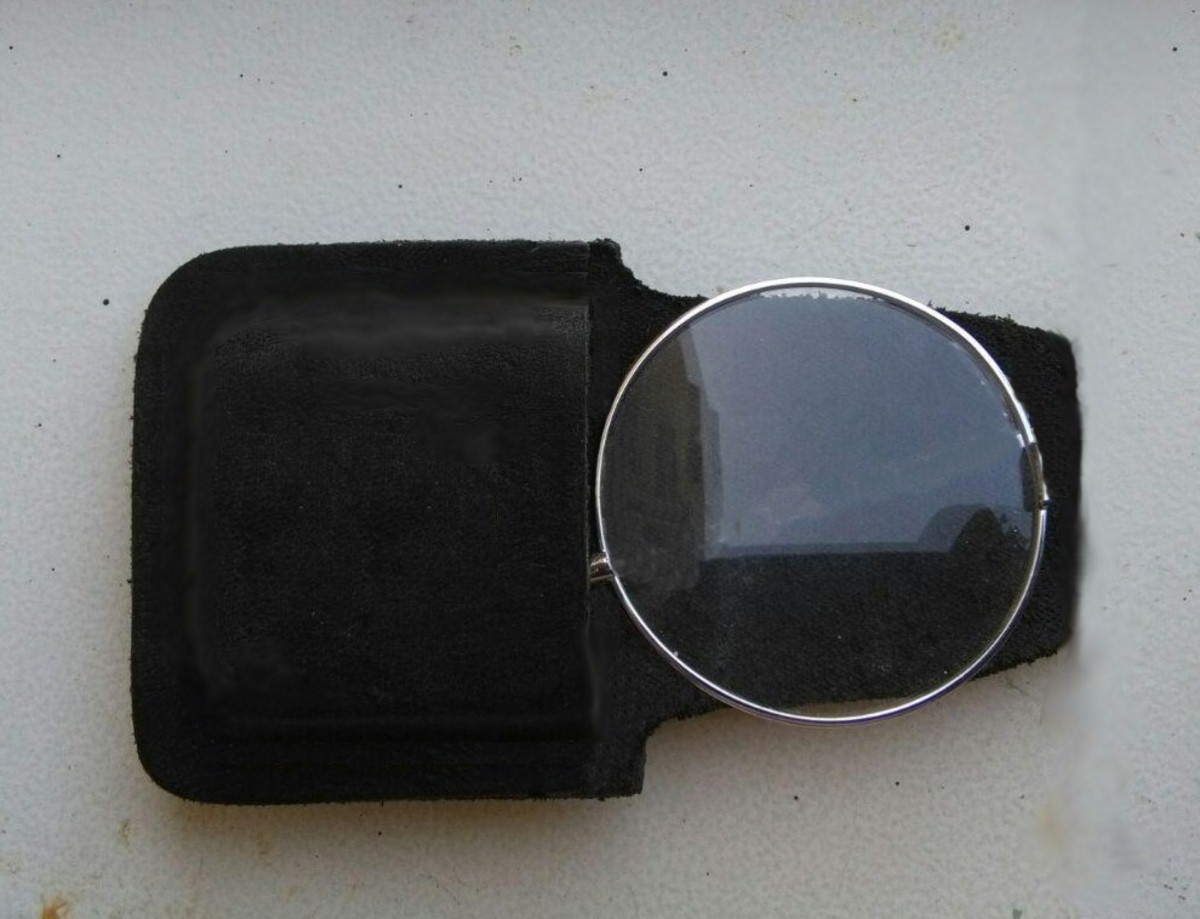
Baden-Powell Unilens

The unilens monocular is a simple refracting telescope for field use, designed by Major Baden-Powell, F.R.A.S.. Consisting of only one lens, it is the simplest of all telescopes, and while occupying very little space can still magnify a distant image up to about four times. The nature of its operation however does not accommodate to everyone's visual acuity, with only three out of four people being able to use it.

== Description and use ==
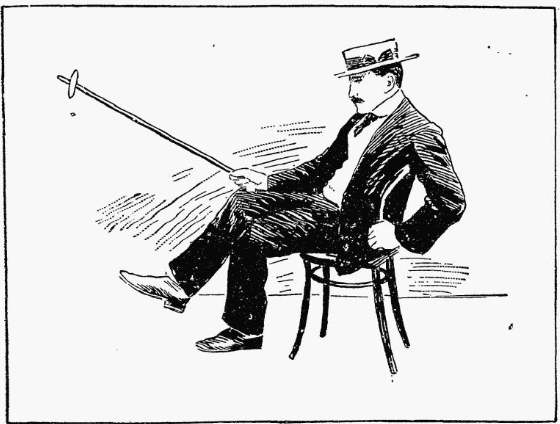
Use of a Baden-Powell Unilens

The unilens monocular is simply a 2.5 inch (6.4 cm) diameter convex lens with a 6 foot (1.8 m) focal length, equivalent to +0.55 dioptres. In use the eye is closer than 6 feet to the lens (usually 3–4 feet) and thus between the lens and its principal focus. Eye accommodation required is similar to that when viewing objects in the far distance, but more so as actual accommodation is made for somewhere beyond accommodation for infinity. Because of this unusual requirement of the eye, only three in four people are able to use a unilens. Prolonged use is furthermore tiring to the eye and thus a unilens is mainly suited for occasional or intermittent viewing of distant objects.

== Use ==
The commercially-made unilens monocular is a convenient pocket size. Its metal mount can be clipped onto a wooden pole in a manner somewhat reminiscent of the "selfie stick" used with today's cameras, onto a walking stick, trekking pole, or umbrella tip. Original instructions advise the user to sit with the arm holding the device resting on the knee and to move the lens forward and back until the desired object is in focus. Normally this is when the lens is held about four feet from the user's eye. Magnification increases as the distance from the eye increases further than four feet, until fully extended to six feet, at which point the maximal four-times magnification is reached but with some image blurring at that stage.

== See also ==
- Magic Eye
