= Bug-eye glasses =

Style of eyeglasses

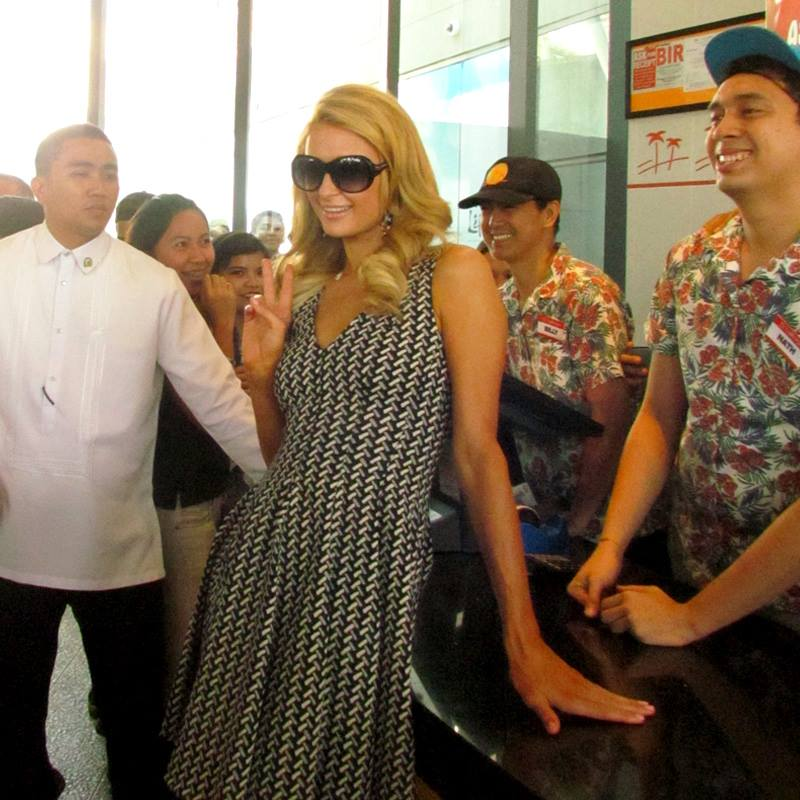
Paris Hilton wearing bug-eye glasses

Bug-eye glasses are a form of eyewear. They were popular in the 1970s, 1980s and 1990s, and were used for regular glasses and sunglasses. They first became popular in the mid-1970s, and succeeded the cat eye glasses of the 1950s and 1960s.

Bug-eye glasses are distinguished by the size of their lens, being large enough to cover the entire eye. They were often tinted. In the 1970s, they were more of a square shape, and then later evolved into the more characteristic, larger, rounder and more familiar bug-eyed style of the 1980s. Their popularity began to decline later, as glasses became easier to get and more affordable.

Bug-eye sunglasses lenses are larger than regular eyeglasses, and today's oversize-framed eyeglasses have inherited the look and feel of bug-eye eyewear, gradually incorporating modern, trendy design concepts to enhance the wearer's personalized look and protect them from UV rays.

They were fashionable for men and women; the sunglasses form remains fashionable today, while the traditional glasses are now associated mainly with the elderly. They were followed by the thick-rimmed, rectangular styled glasses of the 2000s. Notable wearers are Audrey Hepburn, Jacqueline Kennedy Onassis, Paris Hilton, Nicole Richie, Sophia Loren and Victoria Beckham.
