= Unite For Sight =

U.S. nonprofit organization

Unite for Sight
- Founded: 2000
- Founder: Jennifer Staple-Clark
- Type: Non-governmental organization
- Location: New Haven, Connecticut, United States
- Region served: more than 2.4 million people and 97,000 surgeries in Africa, Asia, and Latin America
- Website: uniteforsight.org

Unite for Sight is a 501(c)(3) non-profit organization founded in 2000 by Jennifer Staple-Clark specializing in healthcare delivery to communities around the world. The organization invests human and financial resources in local eye clinics in Ghana, Honduras, and India to eliminate patient barriers to care. As of January 2017, Unite for Sight has assisted more than 2.4 million people worldwide and provided over 97,000 vision-restoring surgeries.

== Volunteer abroad program ==
The Global Impact Corps is a volunteer abroad program that places students and professionals with Unite For Sight's local eye clinic partners. After completing global health training, Global Impact Fellows travel to one of three country locations to support local clinicians as they deliver eye care to patients living in extreme poverty.

Global Impact Fellows can also work with Unite For Sight to design and implement a global health research study via the Global Impact Lab. Primarily students, these research volunteers work with Unite For Sight, the partner eye clinic, and a university mentor to develop a research question and methods; they also are required to receive Institutional Review Board (IRB) approval from their institution. Global Impact Fellows complete a Certificate in Global Health Research, preparing them for the challenges of conducting research in the developing world. Many Fellows go on to share their findings in academic journals or at research conferences.

In India, volunteers have the option of participating in Dhenkanal (Orissa), Chennai (Tamil Nadu), or in Patna (Bihar). In Dhenkanal, Global Impact Fellows partake in NGO management programs while learning about sustainable healthcare at Kalinga Eye Hospital and Research Centre (KEHRC), which was founded by social entrepreneur Sarang Samal and provides healthcare to the 7 million people residing in the seven districts of central Orissa. In Chennai, Fellows join the Pranav Foundation, founded by ophthalmologists Dr. Senthil and Dr. N Malathi, in providing eye care outreach programs to remote communities. In Patna, Fellows work alongside cataract and glaucoma specialist Dr. Satyajit Sinha, ophthalmologist Dr. Ajit Sinha, and retina specialist Dr. Pooja Sinha at the A.B. Eye Institute and outreach clinics to deliver free eye care; they also have the opportunity to visit Bihar Netraheen Parishad, the only school in Bihar exclusively for blind girls.

Unite For Sight's program in Ghana includes three eye clinics in Accra and two in Kumasi. One-week volunteers travel to Crystal Eye Clinic to assist Dr. James Clarke and clinic staff in conducting village eye care outreach programs. Global Impact Fellows staying for more than a week rotate between multiple clinics and have the opportunity to participate in long-distance or overnight outreach programs.

In Tegucigalpa, Honduras, Global Impact Fellows accompany Centro de Salud Integral Zoe staff, on outreach trips to remote villages up to three hours outside of the city, helping to provide eye exams, glasses, and medication to over 100 patients a day.

In August 2012, Unite For Sight established a partnership with Global Eyeglasses, an online eyeglasses retailer, to obtain 50 new pairs of prescription glasses each month for use in their eye clinics around the world.

== Global Health University ==
Global Health University (GHU) is an online compendium of educational resources for students and professionals involved in global health. It consists of certificate programs, free webinars led by experts in their respective fields, and consulting for non-profit and for-profit social ventures. Cultural competency, social entrepreneurship, research, monitoring evaluation, and program development & management are among the many topics covered by GHU programming. Unite For Sight also offers internship opportunities for current students and recent graduates.

== Global Health and Innovation Conference ==
Since 2003, Unite For Sight has hosted the annual Global Health & Innovation Conference (GHIC), the world's leading and largest global health conference that brings together professionals and students from across the country and around the world. In addition to lectures and workshops featuring leaders in global health, development, and social enterprise, the conference provides ambitious students with an opportunity to present their research and receive feedback. Starting in 2015, GHIC has featured an Innovation Prize that awards $10,000 and $5,000 cash prizes to two social impact pitches presented at the conference.

== Social Entrepreneurship Institute ==
Since 2012, Unite For Sight has offered an annual Social Entrepreneurship Institute with interactive sessions to provide participants with mentoring and guidance applicable to ventures in global health, social entrepreneurship, international development, and education.

== Global Health Societies ==
Unite For Sight's Global Health Societies are student organizations at North American high schools and universities. Members educate their peers on best practices in global health and help to support Unite For Sight's eye clinics via campus fundraising events. Society officers receive leadership training and have the opportunity to complete a Certificate in Student Leadership through Unite For Sight's Global Health University; they can also receive a Certificate in Global Health Innovation by participating in at least five of Unite For Sight's free webinars during the academic year.
