= Randolph Engineering =

Manufacturer of sunglasses

Randolph Engineering, Inc.
- Industry: Eye-wear
- Founded: 1973
- Headquarters: Randolph, Massachusetts
- Key people: Peter Waszkiewicz, CEO
- Number of employees: 50
- Website: http://www.randolphusa.com

Randolph Engineering, Inc. is an American manufacturer of sunglasses, shooting glasses, and prescription glasses. Located in Randolph, Massachusetts, it is also the prime contractor for providing aviator sunglasses to the United States military.

== History ==
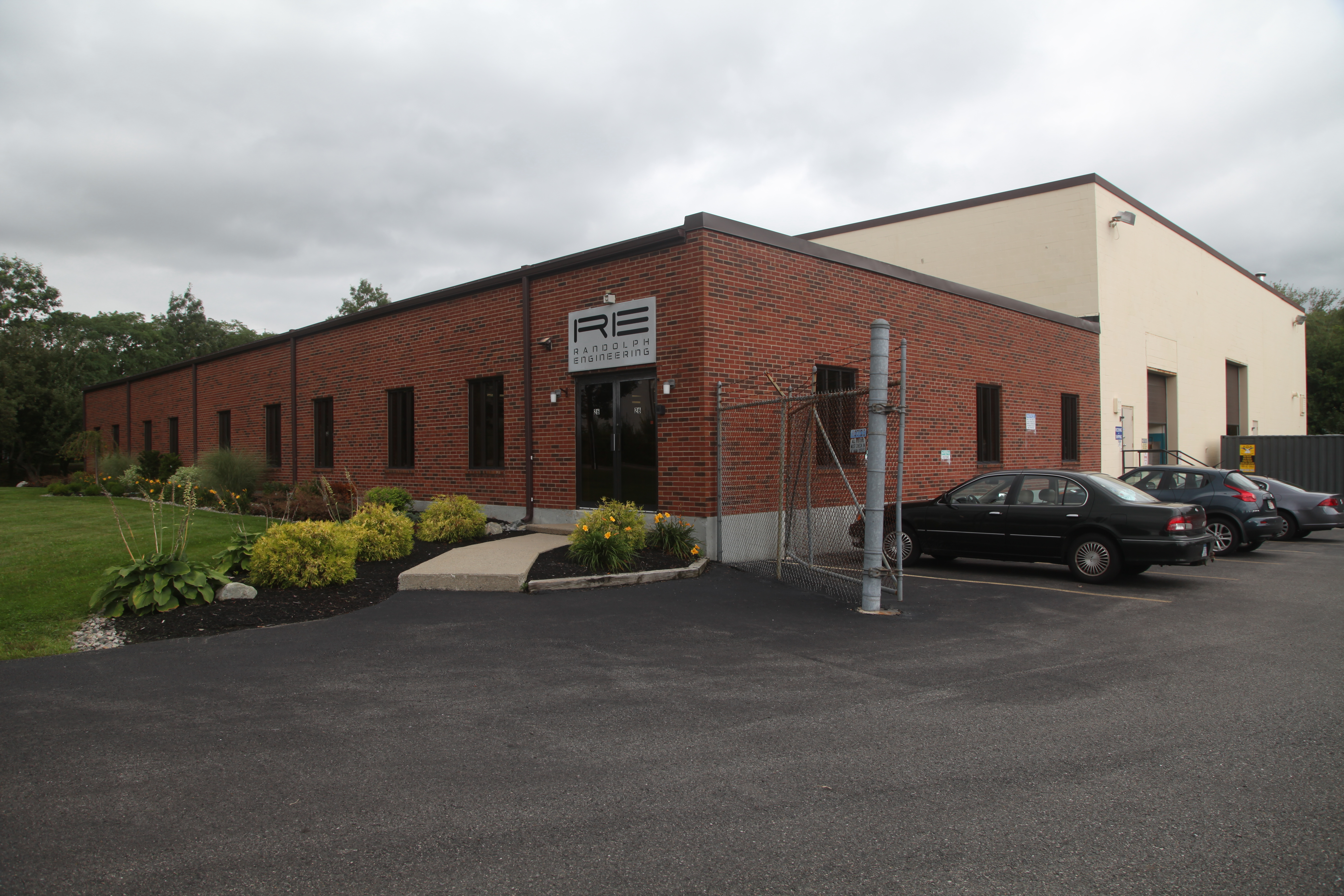
Randolph's manufacturing facility in Randolph, Massachusetts, in 2013

Jan Waszkiewicz and Stanley Zaleski formed the company in 1973 in Randolph, Massachusetts, where the company remains to this day.

Jan Waszkiewicz was educated at Northeastern University and got a job as a tool and die maker. He later found employment at the American Optical Company and then Marine Optical.

Convinced that he could design and manufacture better eyeglass frame manufacturing equipment, he and his partner Stanley Zaleski formed Randolph Engineering, Inc. in 1973.

The company originally focused on designing and manufacturing optical tools and machinery for the production of eyewear. Waszkiewicz and Zaleski designed and made most of the machinery in their plant, but over time the company turned its attention to making its own eyewear, using the tools and machinery designed and manufactured by their company.

In 1977, Randolph Engineering obtained its first government contract. By 1982, they had become the prime contractor for military-style Type HGU-4/P aviator sunglasses for the United States Department of Defense. With 68 employees, 200,000 pairs of sunglasses were made for the Navy, Air Force, and Army that year.

Since that time they have provided eyewear for many government agencies, ranging from sunglasses for air force pilots to eyewear for submarine personnel. In the early 1990s, sales were expanded to offer their products to the consumer marketplace. By August 2008, the company had expanded its eyewear offerings to include other specialty lines of sunglasses for police, security personnel, outdoor sports enthusiasts and other sight-critical occupations and outdoor enthusiasts.

Presently the company supplies the military with a variety of glasses and frames including contracts with the Defense Logistics Agency worth $9 million each. The current contract is valued at $38,662,664 and was issued on December 23, 2011.

In 2011, the company had approximately $8 million in sales.

All glasses are made at the U.S. location in Randolph, Massachusetts using only a handful of international components. Sales are handled through their website, large retailers and worldwide distributors. Randolph Engineering has positioned itself as a vendor to other Air Forces around the world, including Australia, Belgium, Israel, and Jordan.

The Alliance for the Commonwealth and the Massachusetts Port Authority awarded Randolph the 1997 Massachusetts Product Export Achievement Award in recognition of achievements made in International trade.

== Notable products ==
Randolph Engineering has three categories of products: the Sunglass Series, Ranger Series, and Rx Series.

Sunglasses

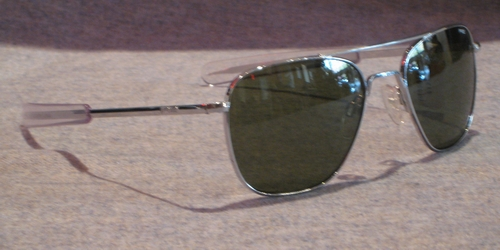
Randolph Engineering HGU4/P conform sunglasses

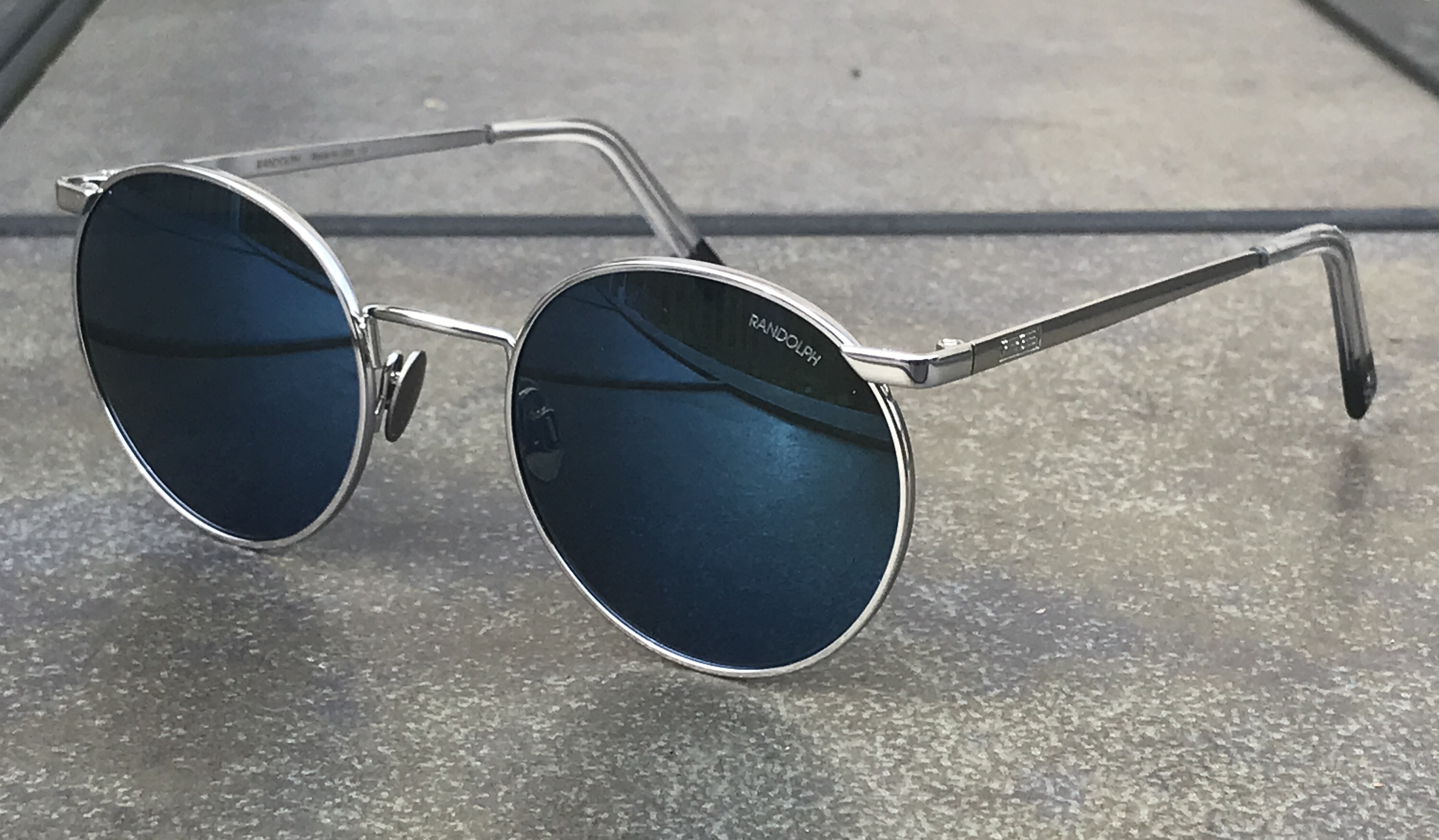
Randolph Engineering P3 Submariner sunglasses

- Aviator — MIL-SPEC HGU4/P military-style sunglasses
- Concorde — teardrop aviator shape like those worn by U.S. military pilots throughout World War II
- Crew Chief — typical of the style worn by aircraft mechanics and line personnel
- Intruder — larger lens design for more eye coverage in the classic aviator style
- P3 — also known as the Submariner; standard issue for the U.S. Navy
- Raptor — wrap-around design to increase side protection
- Sportsman — teardrop-shape sunglasses
- Corsair — named for the Vought F4U Corsair

Shooting glasses

- Ranger Falcon — one-piece shield design lens
- Ranger XLW — 8-base wrap frame specifically made for sport shooting
- Ranger Edge — co-designed by the shooting industry's top opticians for professional optical performance
- Ranger Classic — Randolph's first shooting frame
- Ranger Sporter — designed to accommodate nearly any prescription

== Manufacturing processes ==
Randolph Engineering produces shooting eyewear, sunglasses, and prescription eyewear. Their products come in a variety of lens and frame styles, the most popular being the traditional aviator style. Each pair of sunglasses is made nearly entirely by hand in a detailed 200-step process. An average of 53,000 pairs of glasses are produced per month. All manufacturing processes take place at the company's 22,000-square-foot facility in the United States.

Randolph Engineering also produces their own high-strength solder flux, and every pair of their glasses comes with a lifetime replacement guarantee for every solder joint. Navy pilots and Army helicopter pilots both wear Randolph's matte chrome 52 mm Aviators. In 2011, Randolph Engineering also began production of the Michael Bastian Signature Series. Today, products are sold in over 400 retailers globally and compete with brands like Ray-Ban and Oakley.
