= American Optical Company =

Manufacturer of spectacles and other optical equipment

AO-Eyewear, Inc.
- Industry: Eyewear
- Founded: 1833; 193 years ago
- Headquarters: Vernon Hills, Illinois, United States
- Website: aoeyewear.com

The American Optical Company, also known as AO-Eyewear, is an American luxury eyewear and sunglass company based in Vernon Hills, Illinois, near Chicago. AO-Eyewear designs and manufactures in the United States.

== History ==
Founded in 1833 by William Beecher, AO-Eyewear was later bought by fellow apprentice Robert H. Cole who became the largest shareholder and first president of the company. When he retired in 1891 and Beecher died in 1892, the volume of production was about two million frames and a million pairs of lenses per year.

During World War I, American Optical had eight mobile units that supplied more than 2 million glasses to troops. It provided gun sights, aviation goggles, and sunglasses to troops during World War II.

In 1952, Claire McCardell and American Optical released their own version of cat eye glasses, the first eyewear line by a fashion designer.

After a visit by John F. Kennedy in 1958 to its original manufacturing site in Southbridge, Massachusetts, AO-Eyewear became a go-to brand of the president.

Starting in the 1980s, Warner-Lambert divested from American Optical. In 1982, it sold the vision care and industrial safety business, while retaining its ophthalmic instruments and fiber optic products. As a result, AO-Eyewear closed manufacturing facilities in Frederick, Maryland, and Brattleboro, Vermont. The ophthalmic business was purchased by Sola International in May 1996.

in March 2020, STATE Optical Company, a division of Europa Eyewear, acquired American Optical Eyewear and moved equipment and production to its facility outside Chicago.

== Luxury eyewear ==
AO-Eyewear re-released its Original Pilot, General, and Saratoga sunglass lines. The Original Pilot was the pair of sunglasses worn by the entire Apollo 11 crew with the original glasses on display at the Smithsonian. The Saratoga line was a frequently worn pair by President John F. Kennedy.

== Military contractor ==
=== U.S. Army Air Corps D-1 sunglasses ===
The first aviator style sunglasses contracted by the US military in 1935 were the U.S. Army Air Corps D-1 Sunglasses made by American Optical. They have a conspicuous USAC engraving on the hinged bridge. The D-1 flying goggle assembly was standardized on 13 August 1935, and was actually a pair of sun glasses with a rigid frame and plastic insulated arms. The D-1 sunglasses were superseded by the more comfortable AN6531 flying sun glasses (comfort cable) in November 1941.

=== AN6531 military sunglasses ===
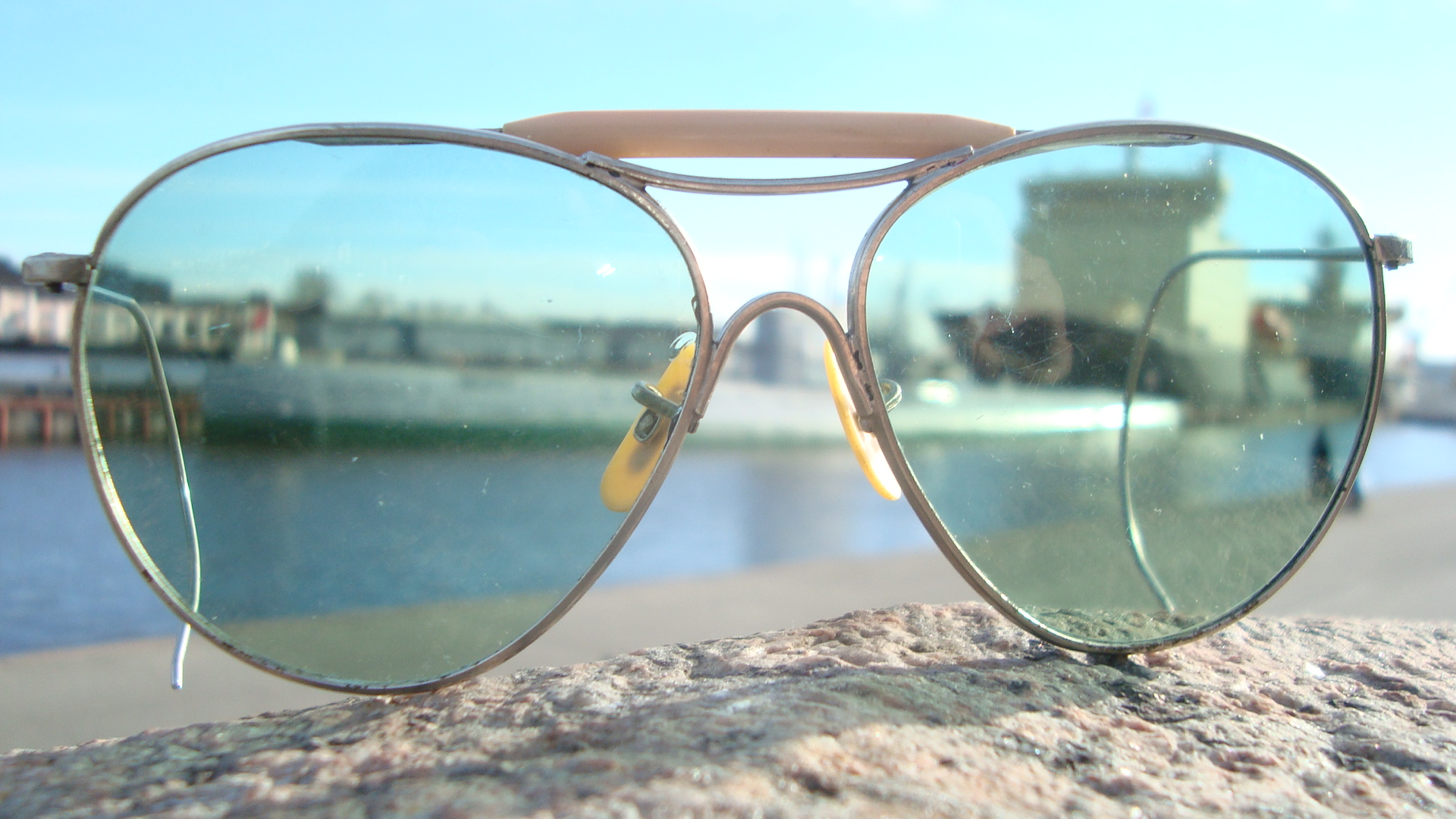
AN6531 sunglasses with Type 1 AN6531 lenses made by American Optical

In the second half of the 1930s and early 1940s, a group of American firms kept developing sunglasses. The military "flying sun glasses (comfort cable)" were standardized in November 1941. They were produced in large quantities (several million pieces) for pilots and sailors. The lenses were made to a joint standard shared by the U.S. Army Air Corps and the U.S. Navy. As a result, the lens carried an "AN" (Army/Navy) specification number: AN6531. The U.S. Government specified the shape of the lens and the color, which was initially a green-tinted lens that transmitted 50% of incoming visible daylight. This AN6531 Type 1 lens proved insufficient to protect pilot's eyes from sun glare so this lens was superseded by the darker AN6531 Type 2 lens in rose smoke. Various contractors made the frames and ground the lenses. These included American Optical, Bausch & Lomb, The Chas. Fischer Spring Co., Willson Optical and Rochester Optical Co. Frame and hinge design varied slightly from contractor to contractor. Despite being designed for utility, these glasses had advanced properties: teardrop-shaped convex lenses, plastic nose pads, a prominent brow bar and flexible cable temples. The nickel plated frame was made of a copper-based alloy to prevent interference with compasses. The teardrop-shape lens of the AN6531 was designed to accommodate Air Force pilots who were constantly looking down at their instrument panel while in flight, and influenced all future Aviator style lens shapes.

The AN6531 Comfort Cable aviator sunglasses frame kept being issued by the U.S. military as No. MIL-G-6250 glasses after World War II with different lenses as Type F-2 (arctic) and Type G-2 aviator sunglasses but fitted with darker lenses until their substitute, the Type HGU-4/P aviator sunglasses, became available in the late 1950s.

After World War II, AN6531 Comfort Cable aviator sunglasses were available for civilians on the surplus market.

=== Type HGU-4/P aviator sunglasses ===
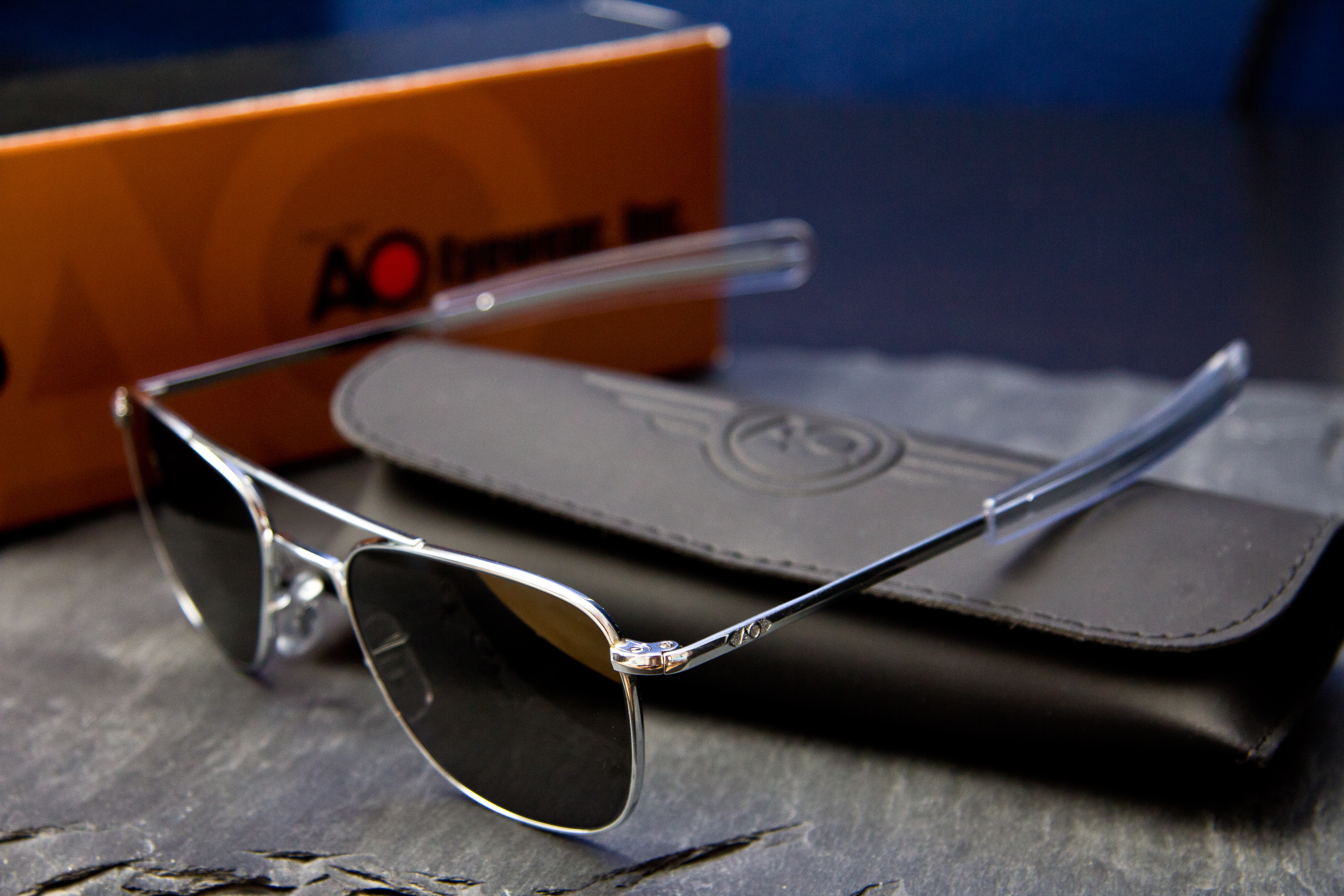
American Optical HGU4/P "Original Pilot Sunglass" (Flight Goggle 58)

In 1958 American Optical created the Flight Goggle 58 according to the then new U.S. Air Force Type HGU-4/P aviator sunglasses standard. Type HGU-4/P sunglasses feature semi-rectangular lenses with less lens surface area and are lighter compared to the preceding Type G-2 sunglasses. The HGU-4/P design frame allowed the visor to reliably clear the aviator's spectacles when a flight helmet is worn, and covers the full field of vision. The frame additionally features bayonet temples designed to slip under a flight helmet or other headgear and were more compatible with oxygen masks. They are commercially known as "Original Pilot Sunglass", and were issued by the U.S. military since 1959 to pilots shortly after the HGU4/P was officially recommended by military optometrists in November 1958. The HGU-4/P design frame is also issued to military personnel that require various corrective clear or other type of lenses and allows corrected vision through the full field of vision. Besides the military type HGU-4/P aviator sunglasses were also issued to and used by NASA astronauts. HGU-4/P aviation flight glasses are still built to the guidelines of the MIL-S-25948 military specification, a document detailing the manufacturing specifications. One of the many specifications is that the neutral grey lenses used in Type HGU-4/P aviator sunglasses must transmit between 12% and 18% of incoming visible daylight whilst providing 'true' color and contrast distribution. The military HGU-4/P Aviator and the Modified HGU-4/P Apache spectacles intended for Apache attack helicopter aircrew are under regular review to determine their functionality.
