= American Optical Company Historic District =

Historic district in Massachusetts, United States

- U.S. National Register of Historic Places
- U.S. Historic district
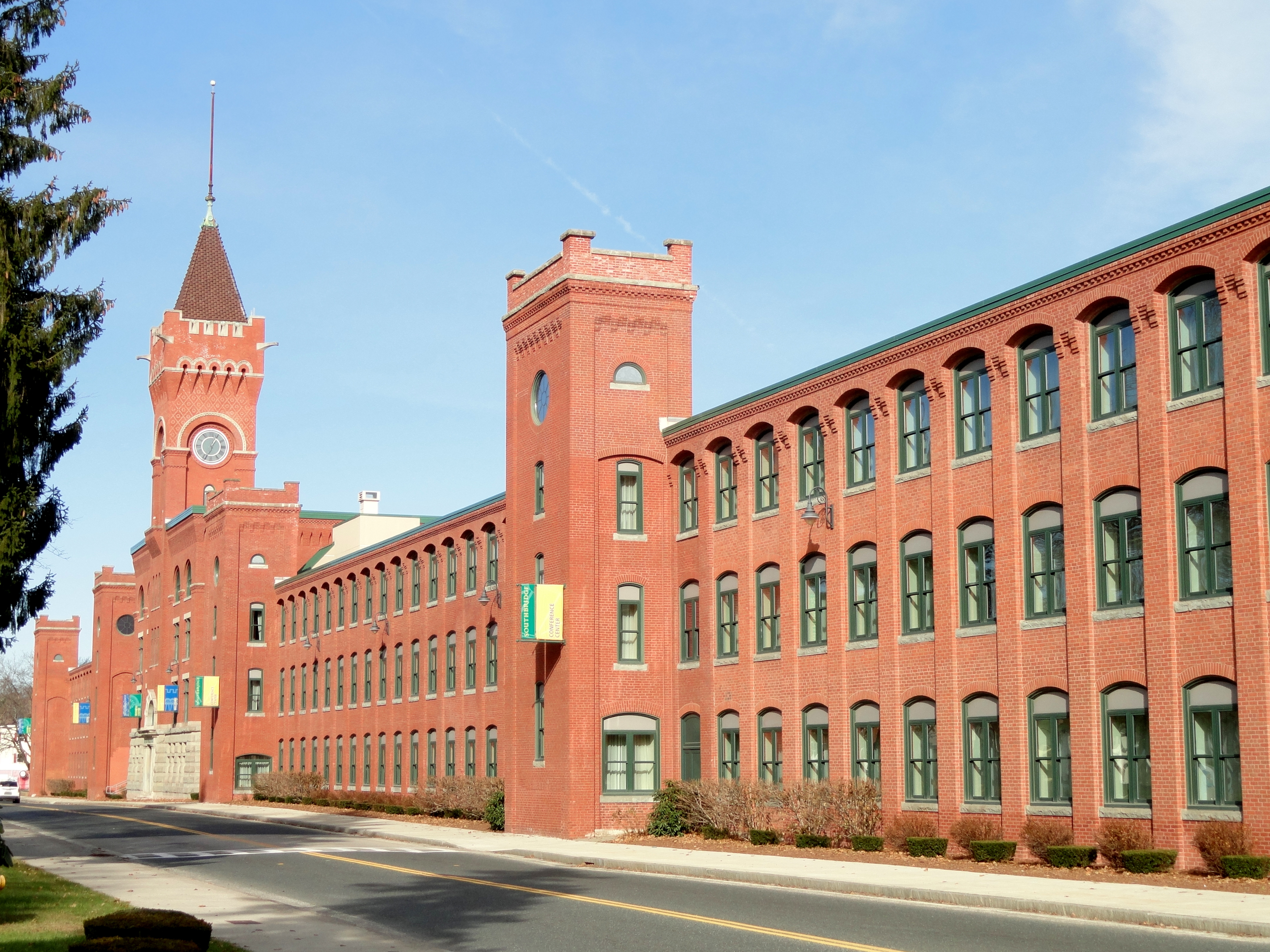
- The former Main Works of the American Optical Company

- Location within Massachusetts Location within the United States
- Location: Optical Dr., Mechanic, Case, Cabot, Charlton, Main, and Wells Sts., Southbridge, Massachusetts
- Coordinates: 42°4′29″N 72°1′24″W
- Area: 80 acres (32 ha)
- Built: 1888
- NRHP reference No.: 100008957
- Added to NRHP: May 3, 2023

The American Optical Company Historic District encompasses a historic industrial complex on the Quinebaug River in Southbridge, Massachusetts. Located on roughly 80 acres (32 ha) east of downtown Southbridge, the complex was developed between the 1880s and 1950s by the American Optical Company (AO), one of the largest manufacturers of eyewear at the turn of the 20th century. The district was listed on the National Register of Historic Places in 2023.

== Description and history ==
The American Optical Company was founded in Southbridge in 1869, by the merger of several other lens manufacturers whose origins in the town dated back to the 1830s. The company was at first located on East Main Street, but it soon relocated to Mechanic Street, where one of its largest surviving plant buildings still stands. Over the next century the company expanded greatly, occupying land on both sides of the Quinebaug River. By the early 20th century, it was the world's largest manufacturer of eyewear, with multiple manufacturing facilities and an international sales force. Although the company's independent existence ended in 1967, portions of its manufacturing facilities continue to be used by successors for glass-related manufacturing.

The company's facilities sprawl across about 80 acres (32 ha), occupying land on both sides of the Quinebaug River and an on island in the river. The former main plant, dating to the early 20th century, is located on Mechanic Street on the river's south bank, and was designed by Earle & Fuller. Now housing a hotel and conference center, this large brick building has fine Romanesque styling. Later buildings of the complex are generally concrete construction, with the lens plant specifically sited and designed to minimize the intrusion of dust into the glass manufacturing processes.

== See also ==
- National Register of Historic Places listings in Southbridge, Massachusetts
- National Register of Historic Places listings in Worcester County, Massachusetts
