= Aviator sunglasses =

Style of sunglasses

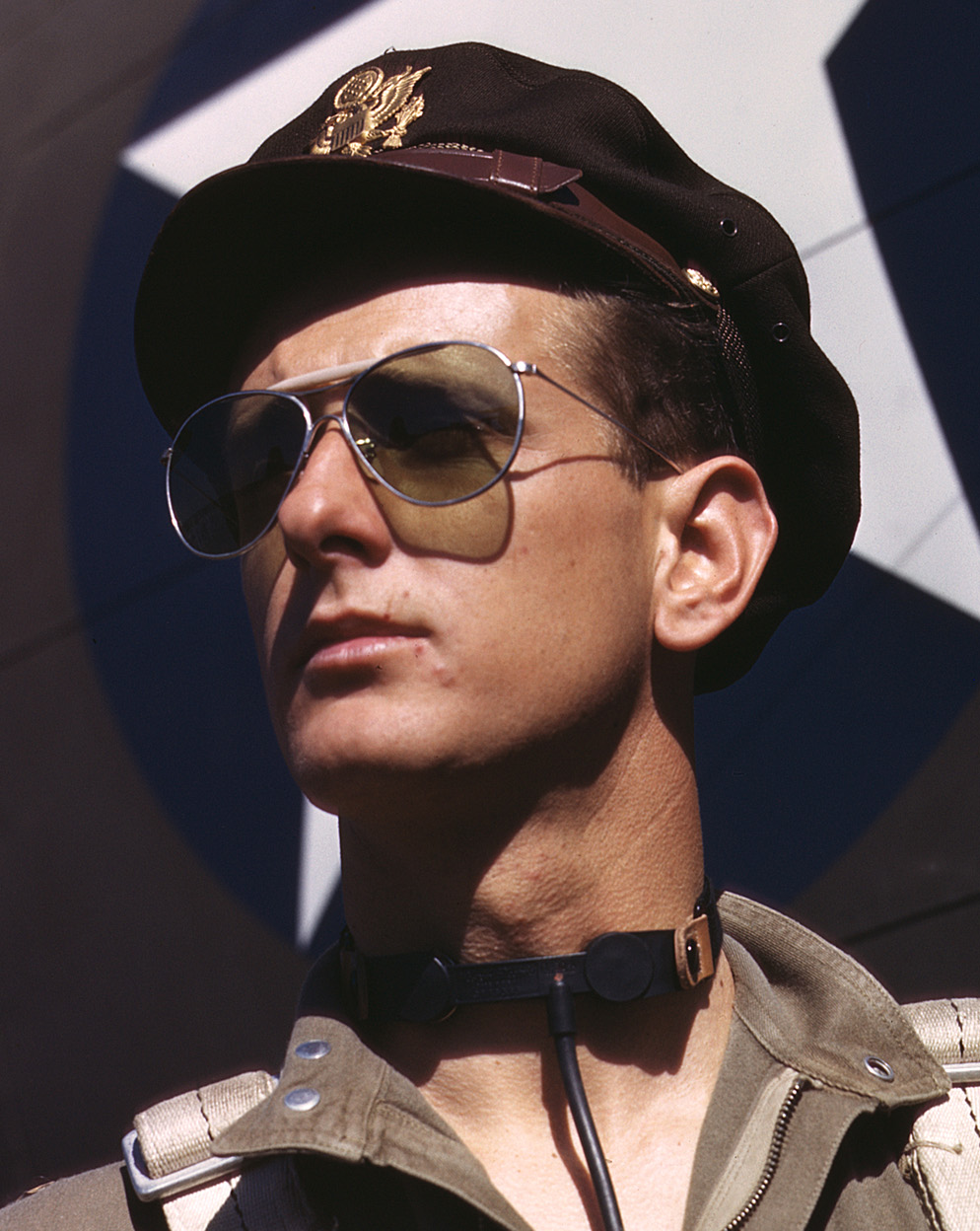
F.W. Hunter, Army test pilot, with AN 6531 sunglasses (1942)

Aviator sunglasses are a style of sunglasses that was developed by a group of American firms. The original Bausch & Lomb design is now commercially marketed as Ray-Ban Aviators, although other manufacturers also produce aviator-style sunglasses.

== Design ==
Aviator style sunglasses are intended to be worn under headgear and are characterised by dark, oftentimes reflective lenses and thin monel, steel or titanium metal frames with double or triple bridges and bayonet earpieces or flexible cable temples that hook more securely behind the ears. The large lenses are not flat but slightly convex. The design attempts to cover the entire field of vision of the human eye and significantly reduce the amount of transmitted visible light and (near) infrared radiation and prevent (erythemal) ultraviolet radiation from entering the eye from any angle.

For selecting sunglasses, the United States Federal Aviation Administration has published an aeromedical safety brochure for general aviation pilots, commercial pilots and physicians. Polarized and photochromic lenses are not recommended for use by pilots. The UK Civil Aviation Authority has also provided guidance on the use of sunglasses by pilots.

== History ==
=== U.S. Army Air Corps D-1 sunglasses ===
The first aviator style sunglasses contracted by the US military in 1935 were the U.S. Army Air Corps D-1 Sunglasses made by American Optical. They have a conspicuous USAC engraving on the hinged bridge. The D-1 flying goggle assembly was standardized on 13 August 1935, and was actually a pair of sun glasses with a rigid frame and plastic insulated arms. The D-1 sunglasses were superseded by the more comfortable AN6531 flying sun glasses (comfort cable) in November 1941.

=== AN6531 military sunglasses ===
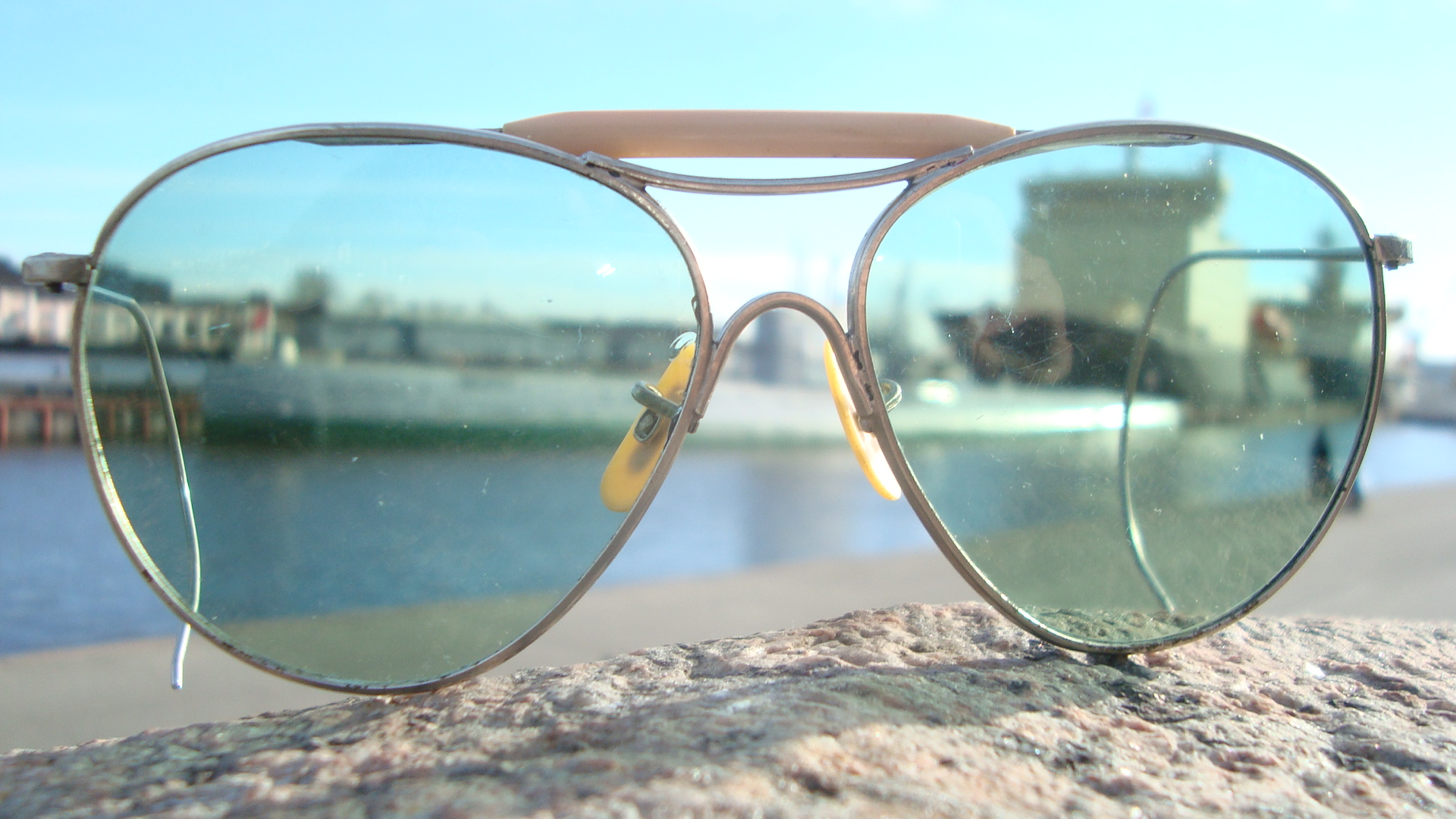
AN6531 sunglasses with Type 1 AN6531 lenses made by American Optical

In the second half of the 1930s and early 1940s, a group of American firms continued developing sunglasses. The military "flying sun glasses (comfort cable)" were standardized in November 1941. They were produced in huge quantities (several million pieces) for pilots and sailors. The lenses were made to a joint standard shared by the U.S. Army Air Corps and the U.S. Navy. As a result, the lens carried an "AN" (Army/Navy) specification number: the AN6531. The U.S. Government specified the shape of the lens and the color, which was initially a green tinted lens that transmitted 50% of incoming visible daylight. This AN6531 Type 1 lens proved insufficient to protect the pilot's eyes from sun glare so this lens was superseded by the darker AN6531 Type 2 lens in rose smoke. Various contractors made the frames and ground the lenses. These included American Optical, Bausch & Lomb, The Chas. Fischer Spring Co., Willson Optical and Rochester Optical Co. Frame and hinge design varied slightly from contractor to contractor. Despite being designed for utility, these glasses had advanced properties: teardrop-shaped and convex lenses, plastic nose pads and a prominent brow bar and featured flexible cable temples. The nickel plated frame was made of a copper based alloy to prevent offsetting compasses. The "teardrop" shape lens of the AN 6531 was designed to accommodate Air Force pilots who were constantly looking down at their instrument panel while in flight, and that influenced all future Aviator style lens shapes.

The AN6531 Comfort Cable aviator sunglasses frame kept being issued by the U.S. military as No. MIL-G-6250 glasses after World War II with different lenses as Type F-2 (arctic) and Type G-2 aviator sunglasses but fitted with darker lenses until their substitute the Type HGU-4/P aviator sunglasses became available in the late 1950s.

After World War II AN6531 Comfort Cable aviator sunglasses were available for civilians on the surplus market.

== Commercial history ==
=== Bausch & Lomb ===
In 1929, US Army Air Corps Colonel John A. Macready worked with Bausch & Lomb, a Rochester, New York-based medical equipment manufacturer, to create aviation sunglasses that would reduce the distraction for pilots caused by the intense blue and white hues of the sky. Specifically, MacCready was concerned about how pilots' goggles would fog up, greatly reducing visibility at high altitudes. The prototype, created in 1936 and known as "Anti-Glare", had plastic frames and green lenses that could cut out the glare without obscuring vision. It went on sale to the public in 1937. Impact-resistant lenses were added in 1938.

=== Ray-Ban Aviator ===
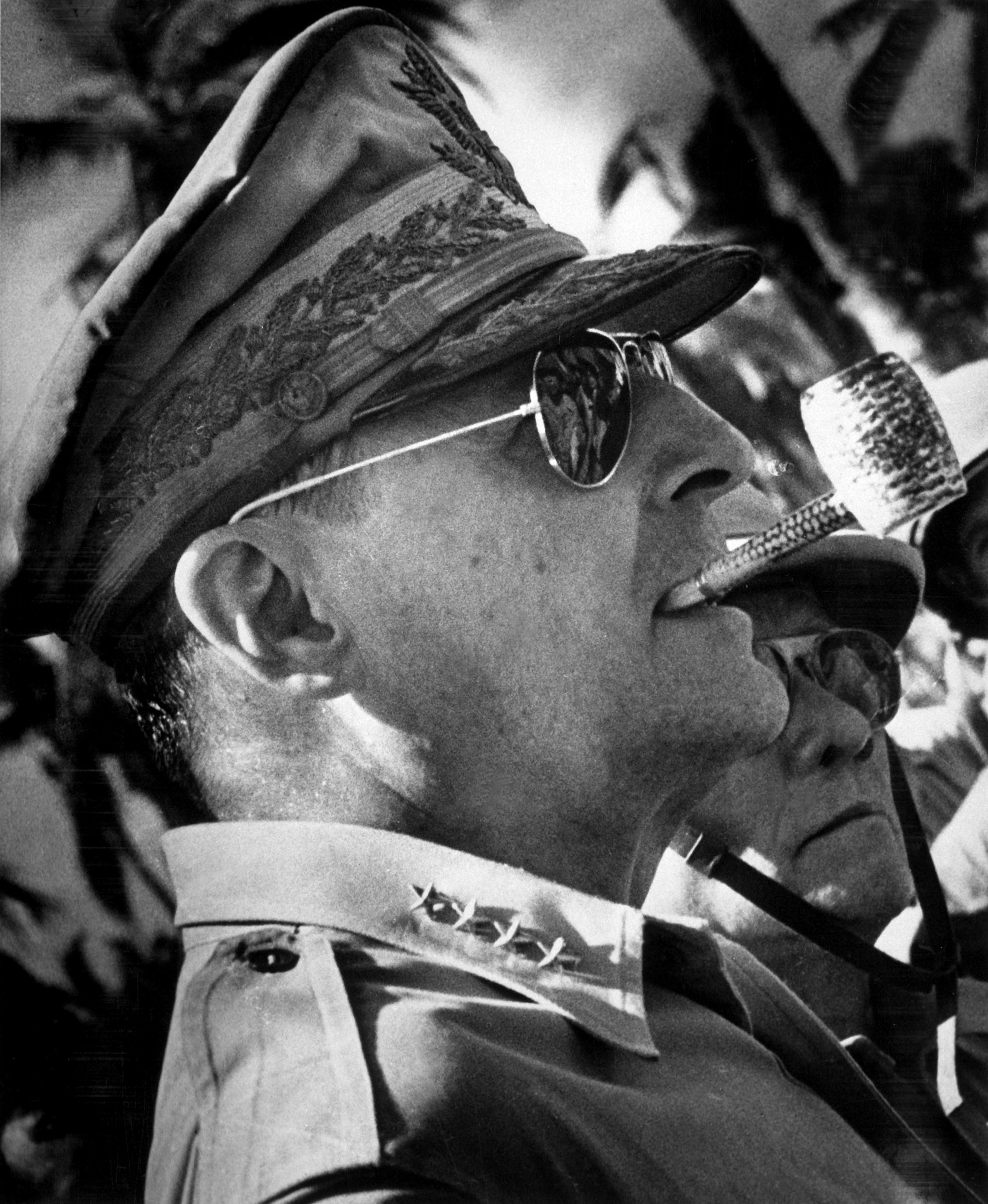
US General MacArthur's signature look included his ornate hat, corncob pipe, and Aviator sunglasses. (1944)

The sunglasses were redesigned with a metal frame in 1938 and promoted by Bausch & Lomb as the Ray-Ban Aviator. According to the BBC, the glasses used "Kalichrome lenses designed to sharpen details and minimise haze by filtering out blue light, making them ideal for misty conditions." In 1936 Ray-Ban had been founded as a civilian division of Bausch & Lomb. This style of sunglasses is credited with being one of the first popularized styles of sunglasses to be developed. In its military usage, the sunglasses replaced the outmoded flight goggles used previously, as they were lighter, thinner, and "more elegantly designed". Writing about the transition of aviators from military gear to a commercial product, Vanessa Brown wrote that, "The War was a ... revelation of the sheer might, scale, power, and horror of the modern world ... [which] necessitated a new kind of military demeanor and gave rise to new definitions of the heroic stance which was to have a profound influence on modern fashion." Eventually, the aviator sunglasses produced by Bausch & Lomb were trademarked as "Ray-Bans".

Aviators became a well-known style of sunglasses when US General Douglas MacArthur landed on a beach in the Philippines in World War II and newspaper photographers snapped several pictures of him in October 1944 wearing them that became a lasting image of the Second World War. Bausch & Lomb dedicated a line of sunglasses to him in 1987.

The first advertisements for Ray-Ban Aviators stated they would provide "real scientific glare protection" and were sold as sporting equipment. At this time, they had not yet taken on their name of "Aviators;" the Second World War had not yet begun. During the 1950s, aviator sunglasses were a part of the cultural style, mimicking the military style. In addition to popularity in the 1950s, aviators were popular in the 1970s and 1980s, being worn by public figures like Slash, Michael Jackson, George Michael, Tom Cruise, Freddie Mercury, Jeff Lynne, Roger Waters and Elvis Presley.

Besides flexible cable temples and bayonet temples, non-U.S. Air Force issued glasses often feature traditional skull temples. Some models have polarized lenses, made of Polaroid polarized plastic sheeting laminated between lenses, to reduce glare caused by light reflected from non-metallic surfaces such as water (see Brewster's angle for how this works) as well as by polarized diffuse sky radiation (skylight).

=== Ray-Ban Aviator variations ===
Transmittance of G-15 glass in old Bausch & Lomb (red), and modern Luxottica's Aviators (blue). Both transmit around 15% of visible light (black).

Besides the standard model there are several different Ray-Ban Aviator sunglasses variations designed as functional, technical and recreational sunglasses. The Ray-Ban Shooter variant was introduced in 1938 and the Ray-Ban Outdoorsman variant in 1939. These sunglasses both feature a large brow bar above the nose intended to keep sweat and debris from inhibiting the wearer's vision. The brow bar and temple end pieces of the Shooter and Outdoorsman variants have been covered through years with different materials. Aimed at the sports enthusiast and outdoorsman, The Ray-Ban Shooter variant incorporates a cigarette holder, a circular device located at the center of the nose bridge originally intended to free the sportsman's hands while taking aim. In 1953 Ray-Ban introduced G-15 tempered glass lenses. These neutral gray/green lenses transmit 15% of incoming visible light whilst providing "true" color and contrast distribution.

== Military type HGU-4/P aviator sunglasses ==
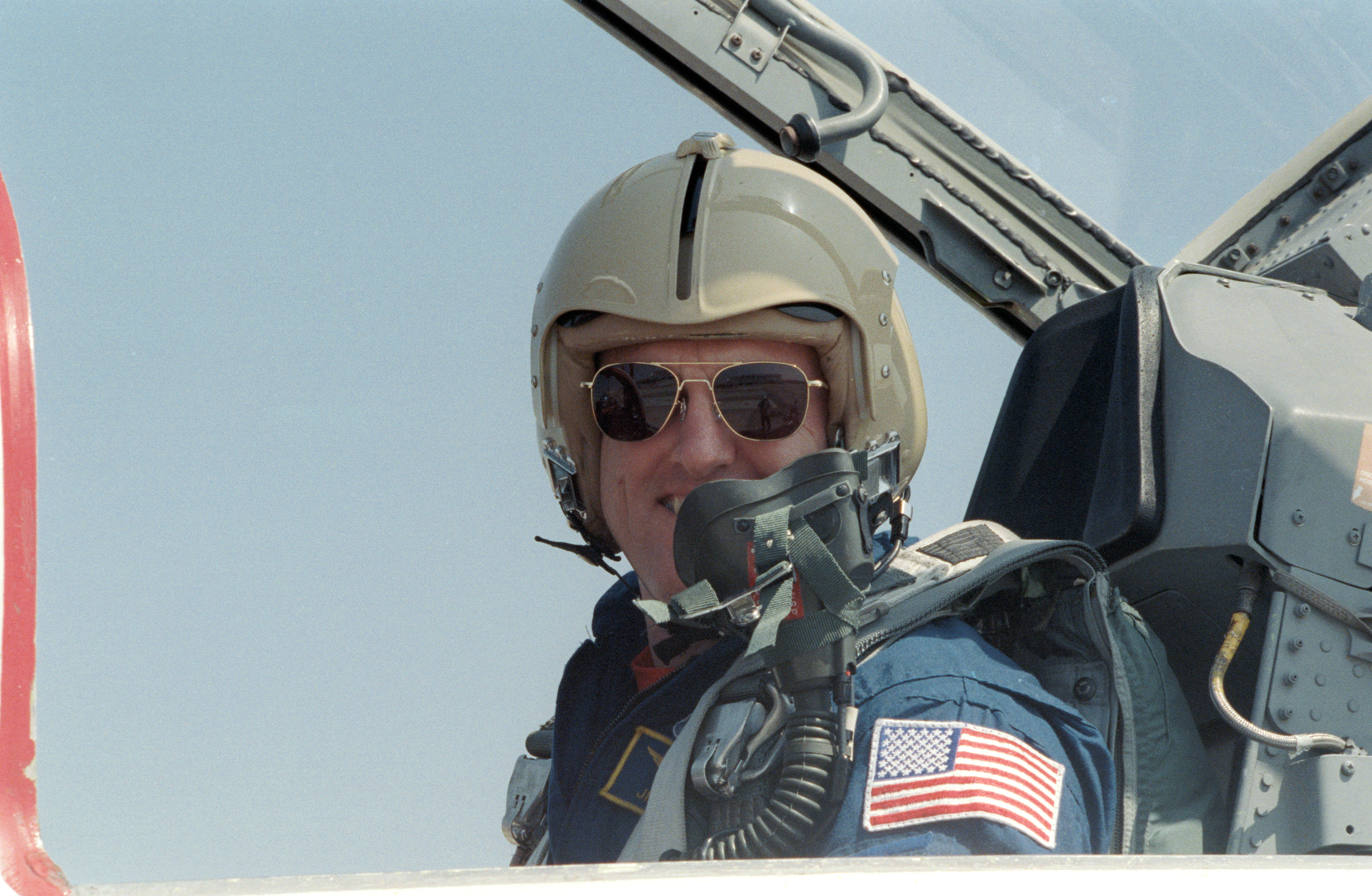
US Test pilot and NASA astronaut James Buchli wearing HGU4/P sunglasses (1989)

In 1958, American Optical created the Flight Goggle 58 according to the then-new U.S. Air Force Type HGU-4/P aviator sunglasses standard. Type HGU-4/P sunglasses feature semi-rectangular lenses with less lens surface area and are lighter compared to the preceding Type G-2 sunglasses. The HGU-4/P design frame allowed the visor to reliably clear the aviator's spectacles when a flight helmet is worn, and covers the full field of vision. The frame additionally features bayonet temples designed to slip under a flight helmet or other headgear and was more compatible with oxygen masks. They are commercially known as "Original Pilot Sunglass", and were issued by the U.S. military in 1959 to pilots shortly after the HGU4/P was officially recommended by military optometrists in November 1958. The HGU-4/P design frame is also issued to military personnel that require various corrective clear or other types of lenses and allows corrected vision through the full field of vision. Besides the military, Type HGU-4/P aviator sunglasses were also issued to and used by NASA astronauts. By 1982, Randolph Engineering had become the prime contractor for military-style Type HGU-4/P aviation flight glasses for the United States Department of Defense. They are commercially known as "Randolph Aviator" sunglasses. HGU-4/P aviation flight glasses are still built to the guidelines of the MIL-S-25948 military specification, a document detailing the manufacturing specifications. One of the many specifications is that the neutral grey lenses used in Type HGU-4/P aviator sunglasses must transmit between 12% and 18% of incoming visible daylight while providing "true" color and contrast distribution. The military HGU-4/P Aviator and the Modified HGU-4/P Apache spectacles intended for Apache attack helicopter aircrew are under regular review to determine their functionality.

== Gallery ==
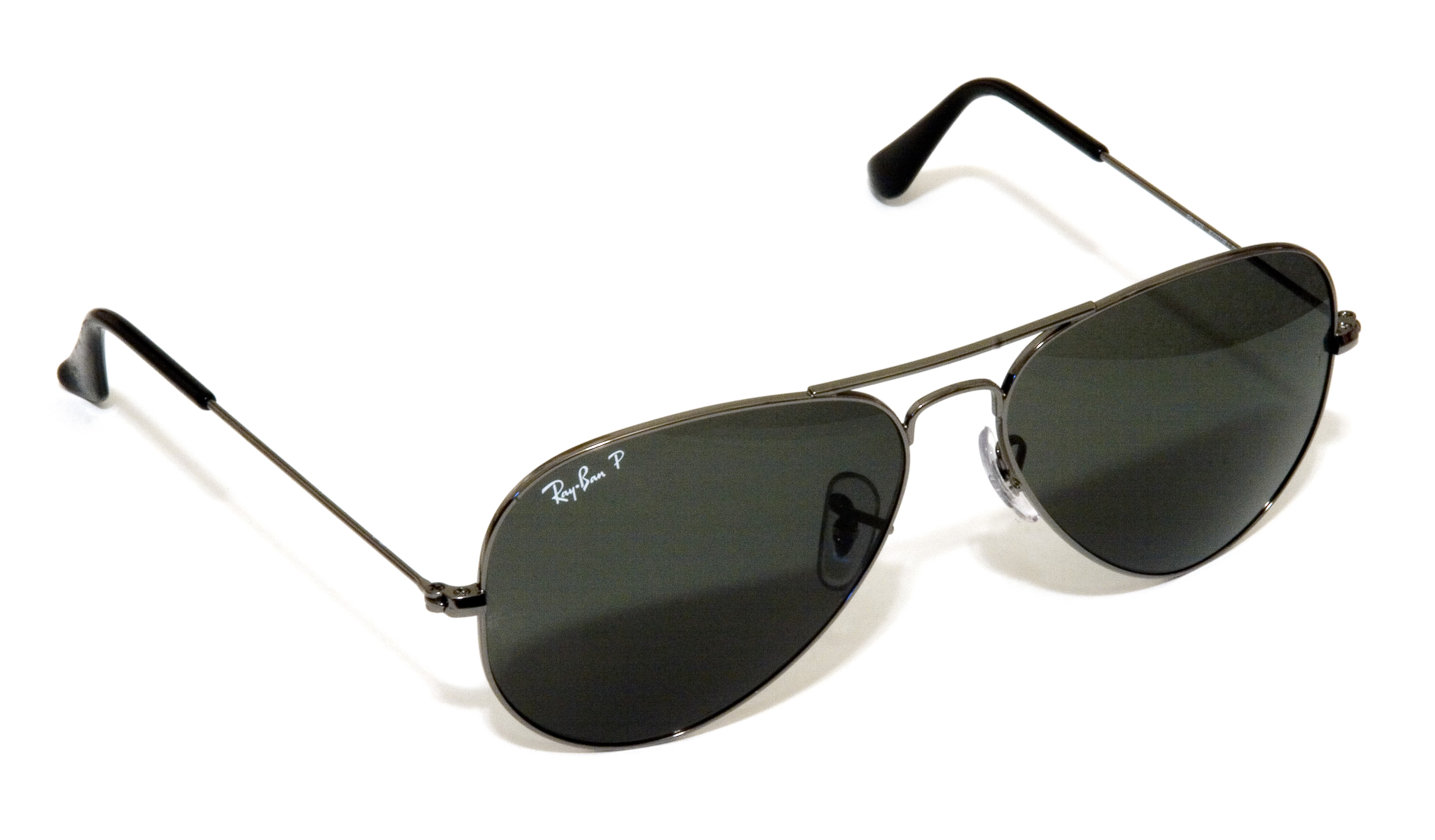
Ray-Ban 3025 Large Metal Aviator (polarized lenses)

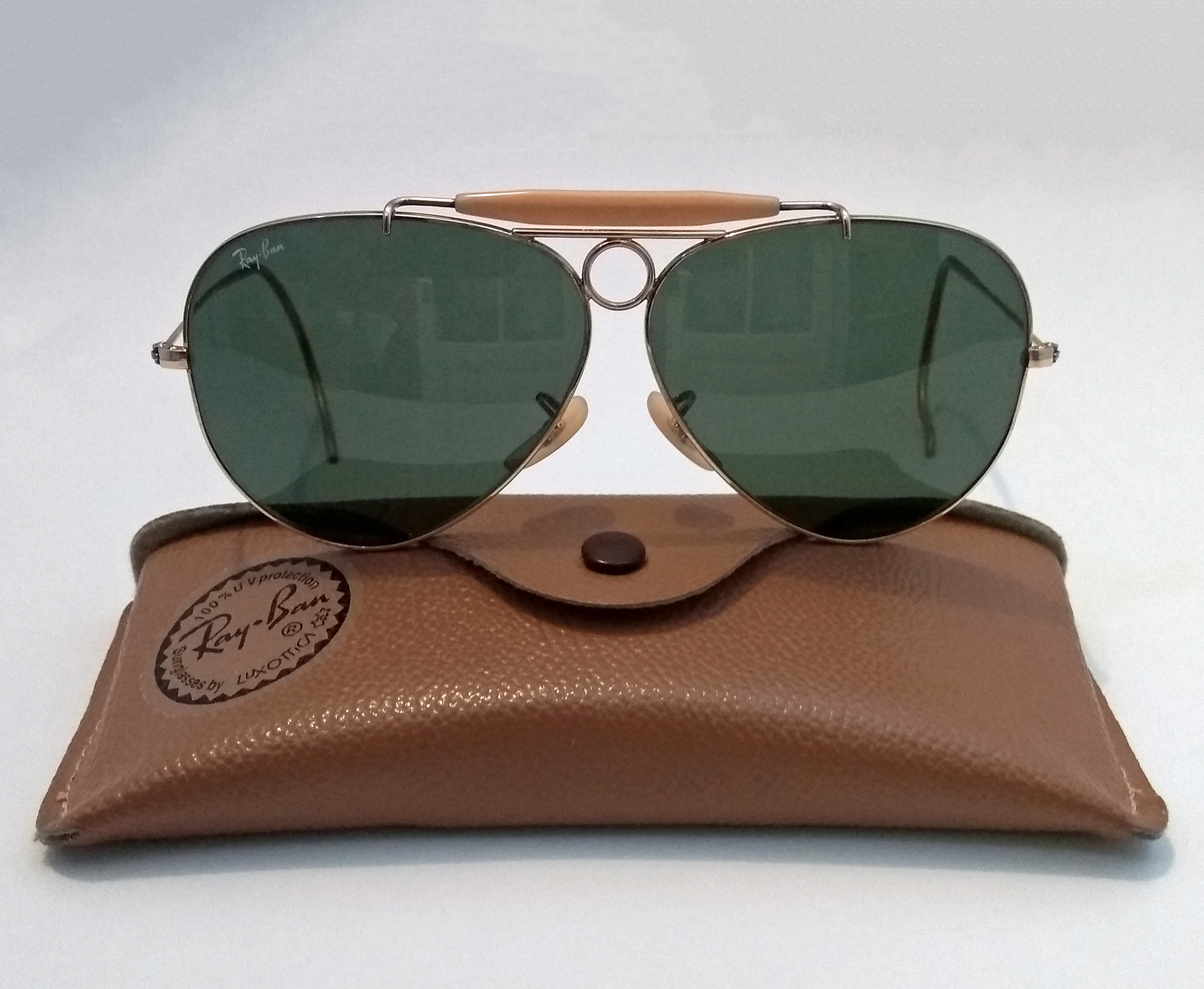
Ray-Ban 3139 Shooter (G-15 lenses, cable temples, 2002)

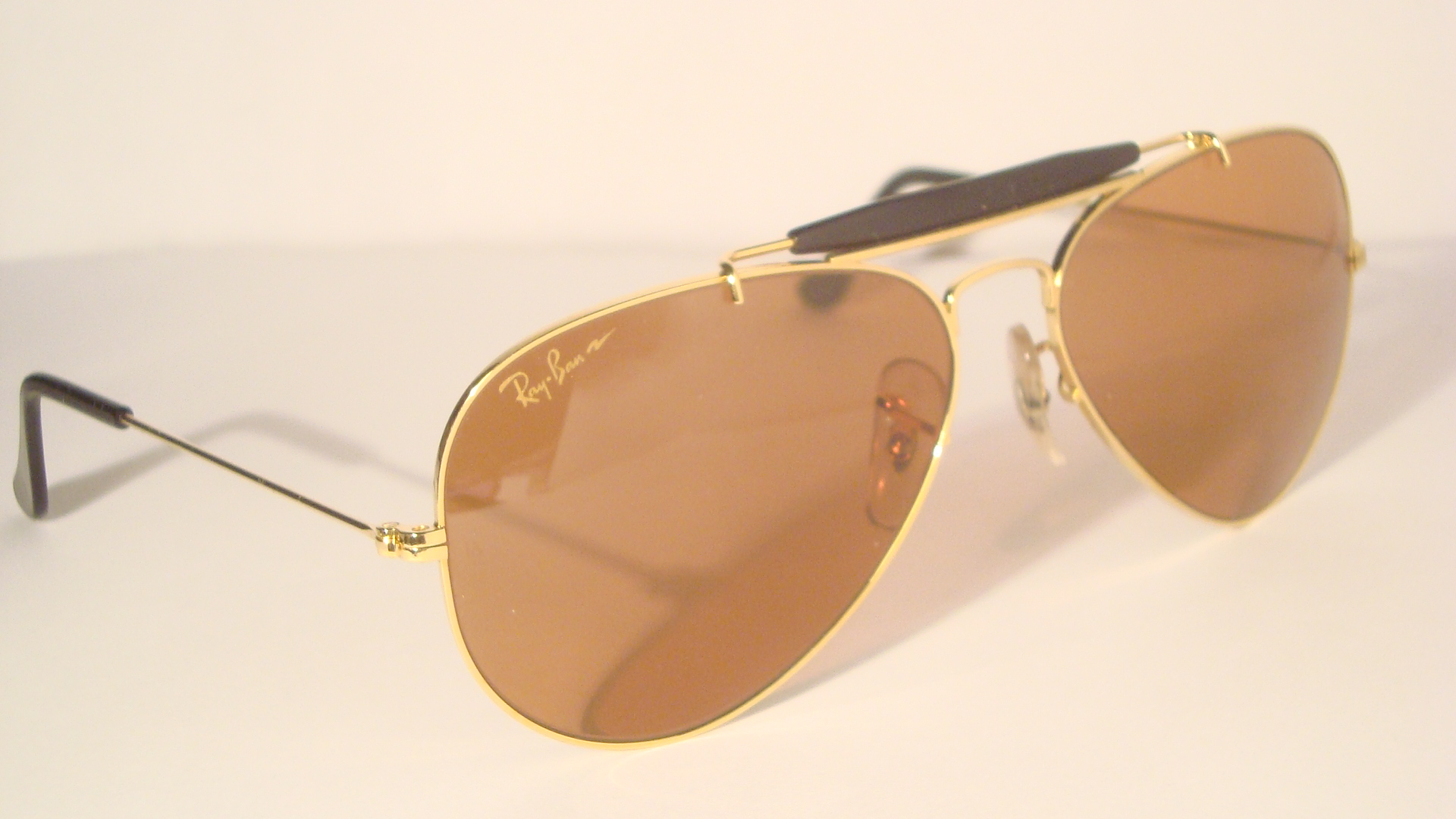
Ray-Ban W163 Outdoorsman (B-20 Chromax lenses)

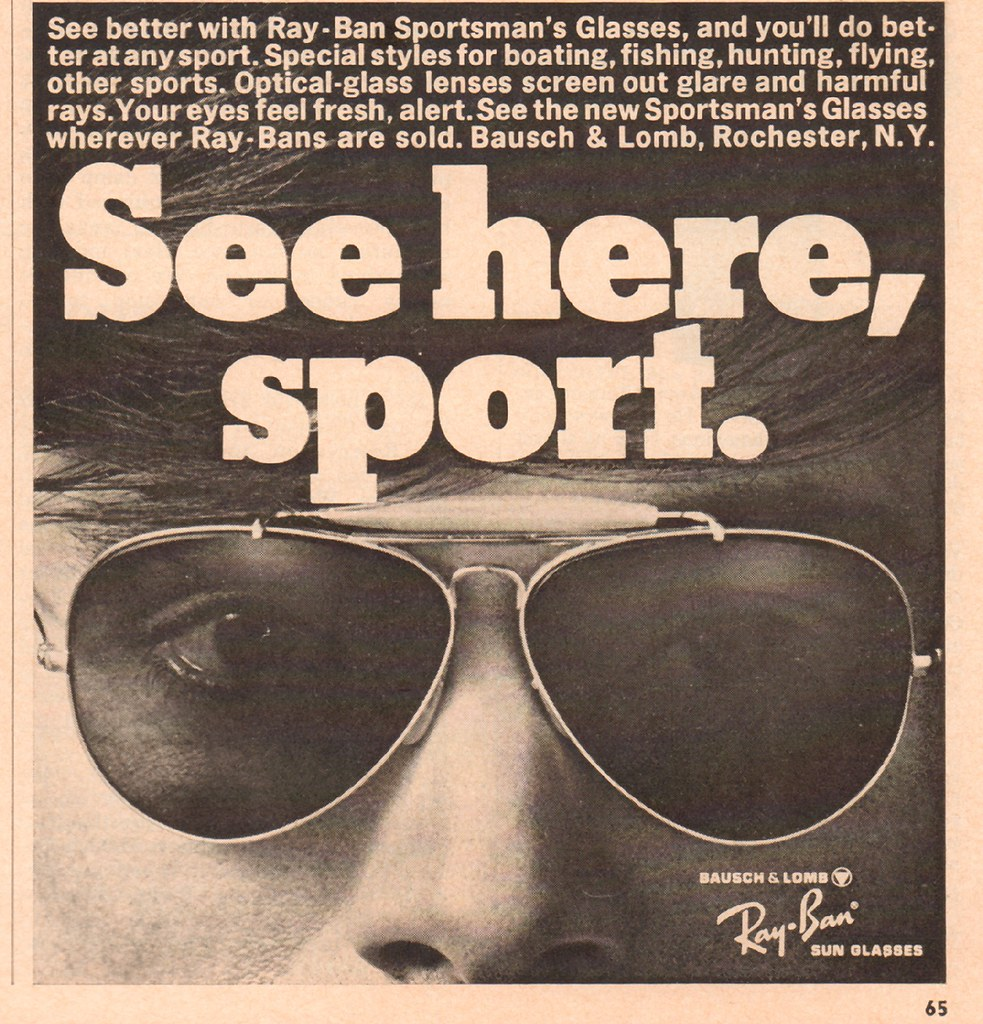
1968 Ray-Ban Outdoorsman advertisement

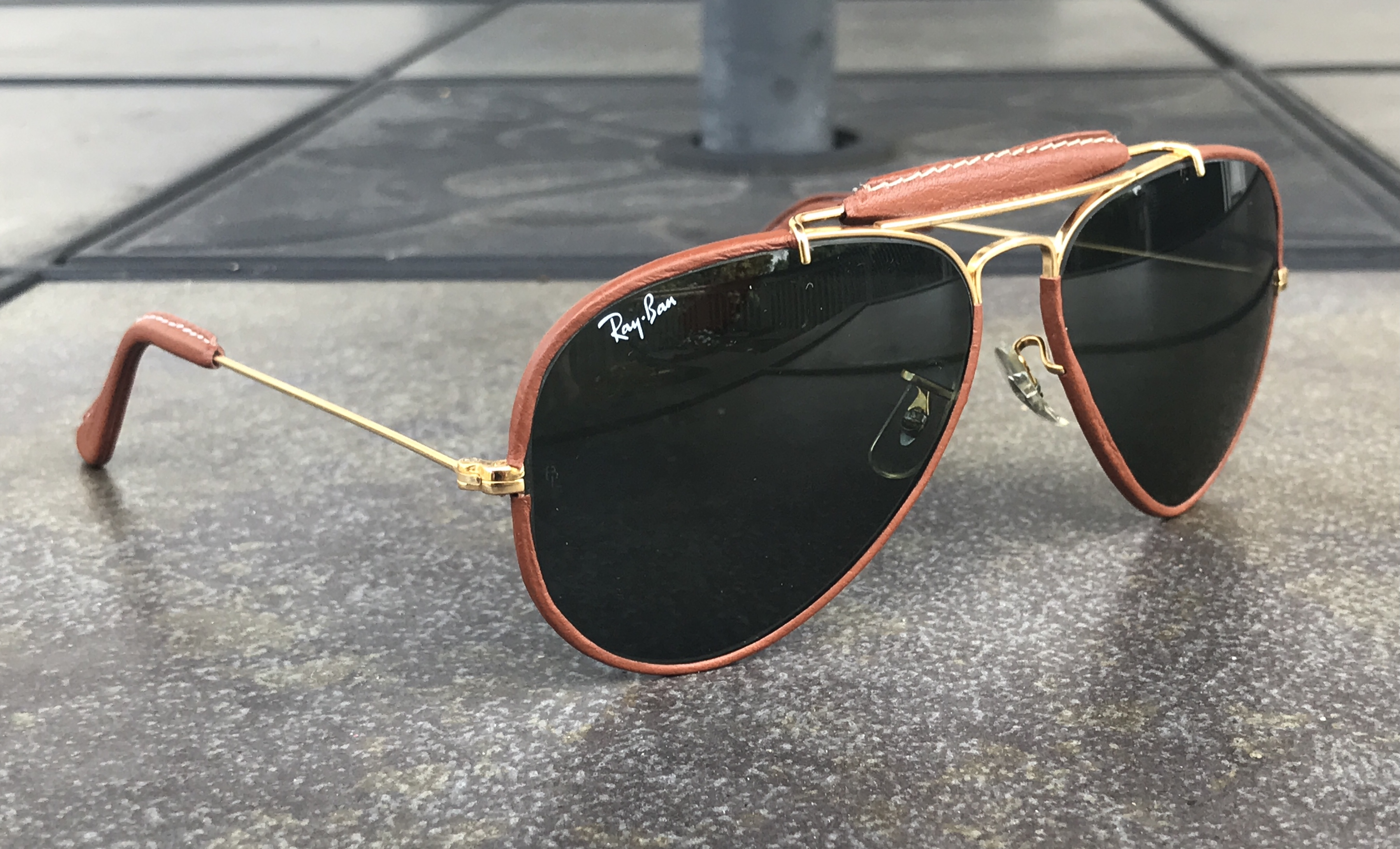
Ray-Ban Leathers Outdoorsman II (c. 1980s)

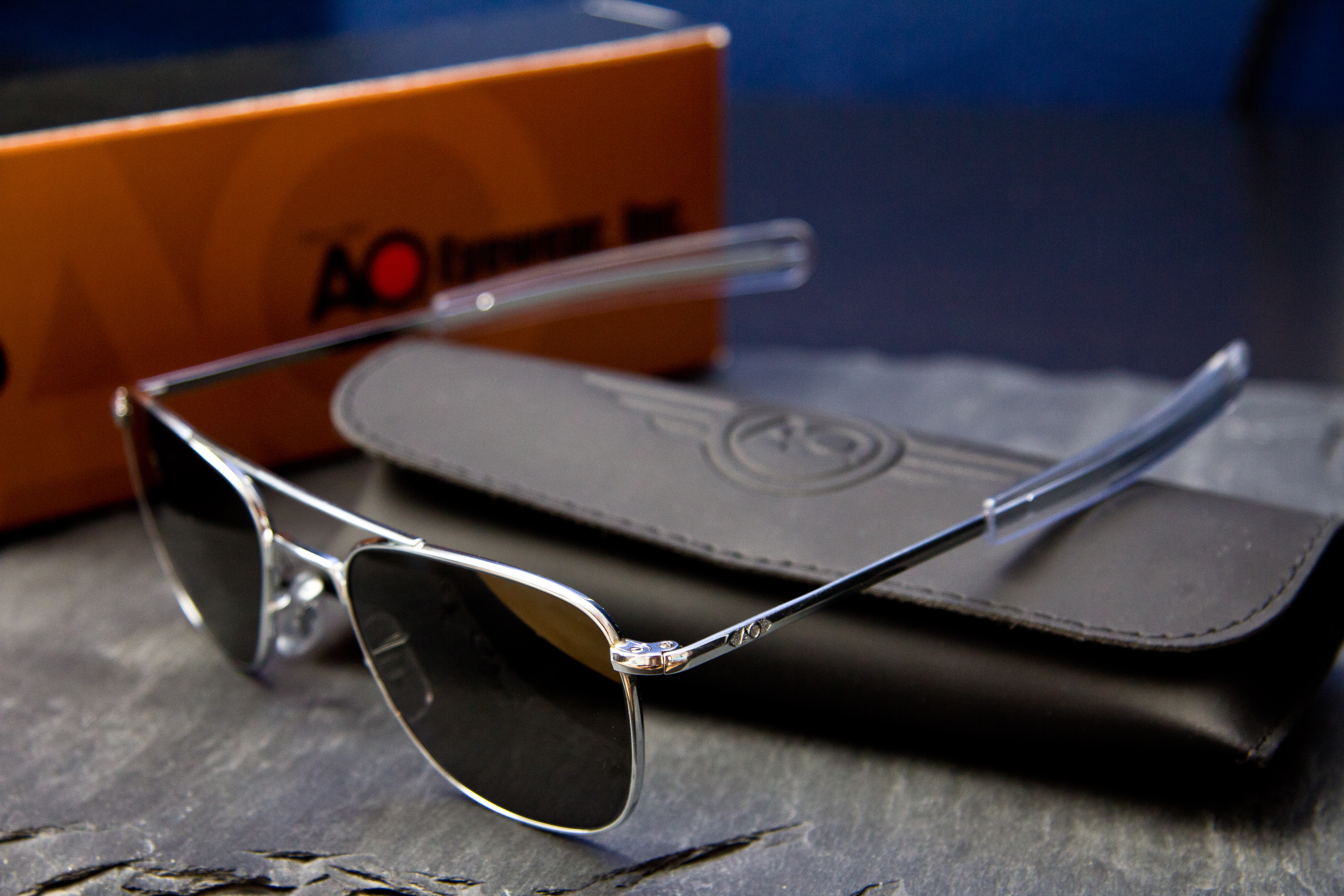
American Optical HGU4/P Original Pilot Sunglass (Flight Goggle 58)

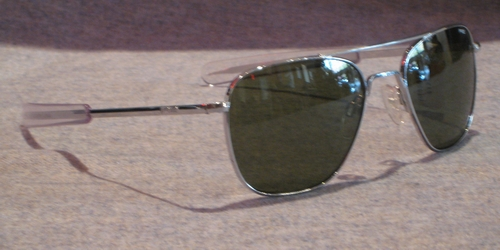
Randolph Engineering HGU4/P conform sunglasses

== See also ==
- Aviator hat
