= Michael Bastian =

American fashion designer

- Born: 13 October 1965 (age 60); Lyons, New York, United States
- Education: Babson College (B.A.)
- Labels: Michael Bastian; GANT by Michael Bastian; Michael Bastian for Randolph Engineering; Havaianas + Michael Bastian; Stubbs & Wootton by Michael Bastian
- Spouse: Michael Vasquez (married 2017 - present)
- Awards: See accolades

Michael Bastian (born October 13, 1965), is an American fashion designer known for his work at Brooks Brothers, GANT, and his eponymous brand. He was the CFDA Menswear Designer of the Year in 2011. As of December 2020, Bastian was the creative director of Brooks Brothers.

== Early life and education ==
Bastian was born in 1965 in Lyons, New York. In 2010, he told The Daily Front Row that he grew up with a rifle, working at a Jamesway in the sporting-goods department selling ammo. He graduated from Babson College in Wellesley, Massachusetts.

== Career ==
After college, Bastian moved to New York City, where his first job was as an assistant buyer at Abraham & Straus. This was followed by positions within Sotheby's, Tiffany & Co., Polo Ralph Lauren, and most recently, Bergdorf Goodman, where he was the men's fashion director for five years. It was this experience that led him to launch in 2006 his own menswear line. It was produced under a licensing agreement with Italian cashmere label Brunello Cucinelli. The agreement was terminated at the end of 2010.

In 2010, a collaboration with GANT was launched. The line, "GANT by Michael Bastian", has since expanded to include womenswear. The collection is distributed in over 60 countries worldwide, in both GANT stores and independent retailers.

The next year, Bastian launched two new collaborations: with Randolph Engineering under the name Michael Bastian for Randolph Engineering, and with Brazilian brand Havaianas. He created a collection of 15 variations on current and vintage Randolph Engineering models for the label. For Havaianas, Bastian created four limited edition styles under the name "Havaianas + Michael Bastian".

In 2013, Bastian was again nominated for CFDA Menswear Designer of the Year, but the award eventually went to Thom Browne.

On December 1, 2020, Bastian was introduced as the creative director of American label Brooks Brothers.

== Accolades ==
Year	Nominee / work	Award	Result
2008	Michael Bastian	CFDA Fashion Awards: Menswear Designer of the Year	Nominated
2009	Michael Bastian	CFDA Fashion Awards: Menswear Designer of the Year	Nominated
2010	Michael Bastian	CFDA Fashion Awards: Menswear Designer of the Year	Nominated
2011	Michael Bastian	CFDA Fashion Awards: Menswear Designer of the Year	Won
2012	Michael Bastian	GMHC Fashion Forward: Style Vault Award	Won
2013	Michael Bastian	CFDA Fashion Awards: Menswear Designer of the Year	Nominated

== Personal life ==
Bastian and his husband are residents of New York City. Although he knows how to operate a handgun, he has expressed he has never fired one.
